= Pei Wei (Jin dynasty) =

Jin dynasty minister and Xuanxue thinker (267–300)

- 裴頠

Zhongshuzi to the Crown Prince (太子中庶子)
- In office 281 – ?
- Monarch: Emperor Wu of Jin

Cavalier In Regular Attendance (散騎常侍)
- In office 281 – ?
- Monarch: Emperor Wu of Jin

Principal of the Imperial University(國子祭酒)
- In office 290 – ?
- Monarch: Emperor Hui of Jin

General of the Right (右軍將軍)
- In office 290 – ?
- Monarch: Emperor Hui of Jin

General of the Army of the Left (左軍將軍)
- In office 291 – ?
- Monarch: Emperor Hui of Jin

Palace Attendant (侍中)
- In office 291 – ?
- Monarch: Emperor Hui of Jin

Left Supervisor of the Masters of Writing (尚書左僕射)
- In office ?–?
- Monarch: Emperor Hui of Jin

Household Counsellor (光祿大夫)
- In office ?–?
- Monarch: Emperor Hui of Jin

Personal details
- Born: 267 Wenxi County, Shanxi
- Died: 7 May 300 Luoyang, Henan
- Spouse: Wang Rong's daughter
- Relations: Pei Jun (brother); Jia Nanfeng (cousin)
- Parents: Pei Xiu (father); Guo Pei's daughter (mother)
- Occupation: Essayist, philosopher, physician, politician
- Courtesy name: Yimin (逸民)
- Peerage: Duke of Julu (鉅鹿公); Marquis of Wuchang (武昌侯)
- Posthumous name: Cheng (成)

Pei Wei (267 – 7 May 300), courtesy name Yimin, was a Chinese essayist, philosopher, physician, and politician of the Western Jin dynasty. He was the cousin of Jia Nanfeng and rose to prominence during the reign of her husband, Sima Zhong. Pei Wei was seen by traditional historian as one of Empress Jia's exemplary supporters along with Zhang Hua and Jia Mo. He pushed for a number of significant reforms during his tenure which met with mixed success before his execution by the Prince of Zhao, Sima Lun, in May 300 following Sima Lun's coup.

Pei Wei placed great importance in conventional Confucianist teachings, and was taken aback by the growing popularity of Xuanxue in the court during the 290s. His essay, the Chongyoulun (崇有論), was a response to the works of He Yan and Wang Bi, particularly on their idea that the universe emerged from the concept of "non-being" (wu, 無).

== Life ==
=== Early life and career ===
Pei Wei was born into the famous Pei clan of Hedong Commandery as the son of the Cao Wei and later Jin minister, Pei Xiu. Through his mother, Pei Wei was also the nephew of Jia Chong's spouse, Guo Huai, thus making him a relative of Chong and his immediate family. He was very popular even at a young age for his insightfulness and personality. After Pei Xiu died in April 271, Pei Wei was ordered to succeed his father's peerage, the Duke of Julu Commandery. Pei Wei politely declined, but the court insisted that he accepted it.

In 281, he was appointed the zhongshuzi to the Crown Prince and Cavalier In Regular Attendance. He also married Wang Rong's daughter around this time. Emperor Wu of Jin died in May 290 and was succeeded by his developmentally disabled son, Emperor Hui. That year, Pei Wei was made Principal of the Imperial University and General of the Army of the Right.

=== During Empress Jia's regency ===
Emperor Hui's wife was Jia Chong's daughter, Jia Nanfeng. In 291, she launched a coup against her husband's regent, Yang Jun. Yang Jun and his partisans were caught by surprise and were disarrayed. One of his partisans, Liu Yu (劉豫) was coming to Yang Jun's aid when he encountered Pei Wei. Liu Yu asked Pei if he had seen Yang Jun, to which Pei lied to him and said, "I saw his carriage pass out through the Xiye Gate (西掖門), so I sent two men to follow him west." Liu Yu further asked him what he should do next, and Pei Wei told him to meet the Minister of Justice. After Liu Yu left, an edict was made giving Pei Wei Liu Yu's positions, and he later camped himself at Wanchun Gate. After a series of events, Yang Jun was arrested and executed by Empress Jia.

That same year, Empress Jia betrayed her ally, the Prince of Chu, Sima Wei and had him executed as well. As Empress Jia consolidated her control over the government, she and her nephew Jia Mi wondered if they should get rid of the minister, Zhang Hua as well. While they acknowledged that he posed no threat and was very talented, they were still undecided, so they consulted Pei Wei's advice. Empress Jia decided to leave Zhang Hua alone after Pei Wei agreed with their assessment. After this, Pei Wei was appointed a Palace Attendant.

During Pei Wei's time in office, he presented an edict calling for the strengthening of scholarly education and for Confucian Classics to be engraved on stone slabs. The Crown Prince, Sima Yu, was also lectured on how to properly carry out offerings for Confucius and rites for different events. In 293, Pei Wei ordered the son of Xun Xu (who died in 289), Xun Fan, to complete his father's task of restoring the bells and sounding-stones to be used in suburban temples and during court meetings in order to complete the institutional order of rites and music. Pei Wei also attempted to reform the Chinese measuring system, more particularly in the medical field, although his proposal for this was rejected.

Pei Wei knew of Empress Jia's disdain for Sima Yu, who was not the Empress's biological son. To protect him, Pei Wei presented a petition asking to raise the title of Sima Yu's biological mother, Consort Xie Jiu (謝玖). He also asked to have the guards in the Eastern Palace to be increased to 10,000 strong. Pei Wei was transferred to the Masters of Writing, retaining his position as Palace Attendant. He was also appointed as Household Counsellor. Whenever Pei Wei was given a new position, he would always decline, sometimes having to submit more than ten memorials to explain himself in order to prevent offending anyone.

Although Pei Wei was on good terms with Empress Jia, he was increasingly concerned with her deteriorating behaviour. Both Jia Mo and Zhang Hua felt the same as well, and the three men collaborated to deal with the problem. Zhang Hua and Jia Mo were worried that if the Empress remained in power, disaster was bound to happen to them and the court. Pei Wei suggest that they wait for a pretext, as many officials in the palace were comfortable with how the regime was doing. In the end, Zhang Hua suggested that Jia Mo and Pei Wei, being the close to the Empress, attempt to inform the Empress and the others to be wary. Pei Wei did his part by convincing Empress Jia's mother, Guo Huai to advise her daughter to treat Sima Yu kindly, while Jia Mo personally warned Empress Jia. However, the plan failed, as Empress Jia refused to listen to either Guo Huai or Jia Mo, and Jia Mo would die in 299. (Note: This follows the account of Pei Wei's biography in the Book of Jin. In Empress Jia's biography from the same source, Zhang Hua was not involved, and it was Wang Yan instead who was a part of the plot. Empress Jia's biography also states that the plot was scrapped after Wang Yan decided to pull out.)

In August 299, Pei Wei was made Supervisor of the Masters of Writing. Although Pei Wei often refused new positions, he was also afraid of losing the ones that he had. Due to the death of Jia Mo, Pei Wei was assigned to handle affairs below the gates. Pei Wei tried to refuse this by submitting a petition expressing concern that appointing another family member in place of Jia Mo would appear selfish. However, his petition was rejected. Even so, under his new office, Pei Wei pushed for penal reforms together with Liu Song.

=== Sima Yu affair and death ===
On February 6, 300, Sima Yu was falsely accused of plotting to go against his father after he was tricked into writing a threatening edict. Both Zhang Hua and Pei Wei were in disbelief when they heard of this. Pei Wei in particular asked for the edict to be verified thoroughly, so Empress Jia presented Sima Yu's letters for the court ministers to compare with. Even after close inspection, many were too afraid to point out the differences in writing (Sima Yu had written the edict in a drunken state, so Empress Jia had to edit some unfinished words). Sima Yu was demoted to a commoner, but on April 27, Empress Jia, at the advice of the Prince of Zhao, Sima Lun, had the former Crown Prince assassinated.

Empress Jia and her partisans did not know that Sima Lun was actually in a plot to overthrow them. On May 7, Sima Lun launched his coup and had the Empress deposed. Sima Lun and his advisor, Sun Xiu had always hated Pei Wei and Zhang Hua after they refused to give their titles to Lun and Sun in 296. Because of this, Pei Wei and Zhang Hua were among the many ministers that the duo rounded up to be executed. Pei Wei was 34 years old (by East Asian age reckoning) at the time of his death. Following the fall of Sima Lun in 301, Pei Wei was posthumously restored to his positions. He was given the posthumous name of "Cheng (成)".

== Philosophy ==
Pei Wei was well-versed in philosophy, having studied Tao Te Ching, I Ching and other works. He was a staunch Confucianist and was alarmed by the growth of Xuanxue philosophy among the court ministers. Xuanxue was a movement popularized during the Zhengshi era of Cao Wei by the likes of He Yan and Wang Bi. It advocated for a reinterpretation of Confucianist social and moral understanding so that it would be more compatible with Taoist philosophy. Xuanxue grew in the 290s thanks to influential qingtan leaders such as Wang Yan and Yue Guang. In Pei Wei's view, Xuanxue was causing ministers to become unrestrained in their behaviour and abandon Confucianist values.

Pei Wei was especially critical about He Yan and Wang Bi's concept of "non-being" being the root of all phenomenon, and that "being" (you, 有) is a product of said "non-being". He saw this veneration of "non-being" as the cause for Wang Yan and his follower's negligence over government affair, as He Yan and Wang Bi's teachings dissuade taking too much premeditated interference in daily affairs as the best way will naturally take its course. In response, Pei Wei wrote an essay titled the Chongyoulun. In it, he rejects the idea that "non-being" can create "being", and believed that only "being" is capable of creating itself. He also believed that in the beginning, there already existed a myriad of matters, albeit mixed together, and the universe emerged through self-generation as the matters began to separate and differentiate from one another.
