= Xu Yi (Western Jin) =

Meiren (美人) Xu Yi 徐義

Personal details
- Born: 221
- Died: 21 May 298
- Children: Xu Lie and others
- Occupation: Nursemaid

Xu Yi (徐義, 221 – 21 May 298) was a Chinese woman from the Three Kingdoms to the early Western Jin period. She was the nursemaid of Jia Nanfeng, an empress of the Western Jin dynasty.

The position of nursemaid and trusted court maid of an Empress elevated her and her family's position to a higher status, being involved in many of the court intrigues behind the scenes, even during the fateful War of the Eight Princes. Her achievements were recognized by the Emperor and ministers, receiving the honorary title of "Meiren" (美人). Because of this, her case was immortalized in the "Book of Jin" and in the detailed and ornate inscriptions on her tombstone.

== Early life ==
While historical records do not provide detailed information about Xu Yi's life, a comprehensive account of her life is preserved in the "Inscription on the Tombstone of Xu Yi, Nursemaid of Jia Nanfeng," which was unearthed in 1953. The following is a summary of her life based on this inscription, supplemented with information from historical texts such as the "Book of Jin" (晋書). Ages are counted in traditional Chinese years.

Xu Yi was a descendant of a notable family from the coastal region but became displaced due to the devastation in her hometown, which resulted in the loss of her parents and siblings. Due to the famine and chaos, she fled her hometown and came to the territory of Sichuan and Henei commandery and married to a scholar from Taiyuan of the Xu . Xu Yi hailed from Dongwucheng County in Qing province, a region located in the Eastern Commandery. She was often referred to as "Xu Meiren" due to her outstanding qualities and character. “Meiren” was the imperial title granted by the emperor. Xu Yi had a son named Xu Lie.

== Service as Jia Nanfeng's nursemaid ==
Guo Huai, Jia Chong's wife, suffered a series of child losses due to infant mortality. As a result, Xu Yi became Jia Nanfeng's and Jia Wu's nanny. She lovingly looked after her two sisters with great care.

When Jia Nanfeng turned 13, Jia Chong rose to prominence as a close confidant of Emperor Sima Yan, and in c.February 270, Chen Huang, was dispatched to install Jia Nanfeng as the consort of crown prince, Sima Zhong. Xu Yi accompanied her to the Eastern Palace as Jia Nanfeng had developed a deep affection for her. Under Xu Yi's guidance, Jia Nanfeng did not make decisions without her advisor, did not eat or sleep without her presence, and did not participate in recreational activities or enjoy entertainment without her presence.

In 282, on July 16, Sima Yan conferred upon Xu Yi the title of "Zhongcai" (中才人), and her son, Xu Lie, was appointed as an official in the military affairs office of the Minister Over the Masses (司徒).

In 291, on April 24, when the traitor Yang Jun revolted, plunging the state into crisis, Empress Dowager Yang Zhi summoned Jia Nanfeng to her side to plot a conspiracy. During this time, the palace was filled with fear and trepidation. However, Xu Yi managed to deceive those present with a clever ruse, saving Jia Nanfeng from imminent danger. Following the elimination of Yang Jun, her contributions were acknowledged, and she was conferred the title of "Meiren" (美人) for her protection of Empress Jia in the palace coup. She was also granted 1,000 rolls of silk and a retinue of 20 attendants.

Subsequently, she continued to enjoy the trust of the Empress and was entrusted with various responsibilities, receiving generous treatment. In 295, her son Xu Lie was appointed as the supervisor of a thousand officials for the Crown Prince. However, by c.August of the year 297, her health declined, and she began to receive medical treatment at home.

The court sent eunuchs to inquire about her condition morning and night, and palace physicians, officials like Cheng Ju, and Liu Xu were dispatched to visit her. She received gifts of medicine, food, rare treasures, and more. Despite these efforts, Xu Yi died at the age of 78 (by East Asian reckoning) in May 298. The Empress deeply mourned her death and bestowed upon her secret treasures, clothing, five million coins, and 500 rolls of silk. A funeral was held for her, and the following year, a tombstone was erected in her honor.

== Sources ==
- "Book of Jin" (晋書)
- "Inscription on the Tombstone of Xu Yi, Nursemaid of Jia Nanfeng" (賈南風乳母徐義墓誌銘)
