= Zhang Hua =

Chinese official and poet (232–300)

- 張華
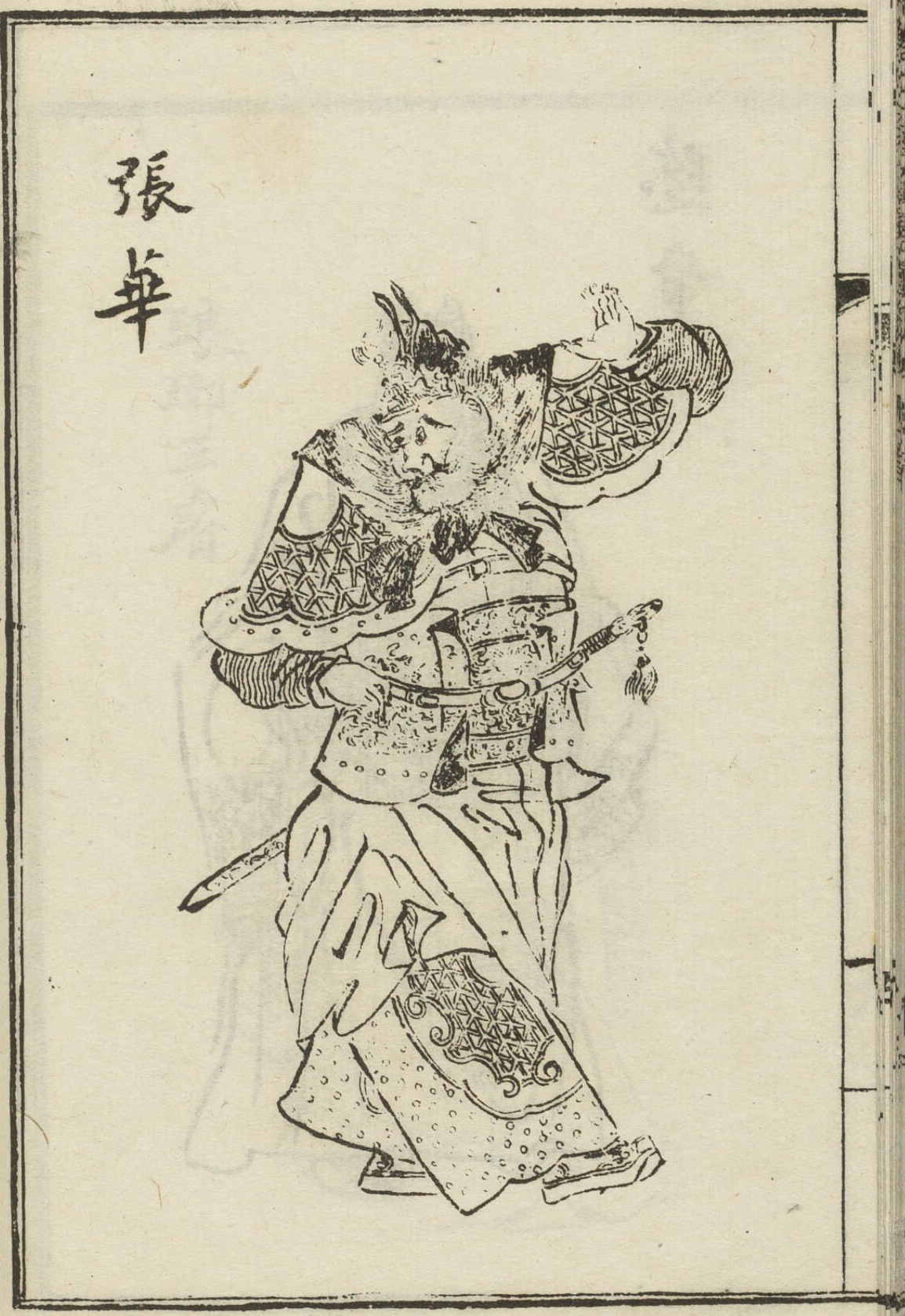

Minister of Works (司空)
- In office c. March 296 – 7 May 300

Supervisor of the Palace Writers (中書監)
- In office 291 – c.March 296

Palace Attendant (侍中)
- In office 291–296

Right Household Counsellor (右光祿大夫)
- In office 291–296
- Monarch: Emperor Hui of Jin

Official of Ceremonies (太常卿)
- In office ?–290

General Who Stabilises the North (安北將軍)
- In office ?–?

Colonel Who Protects the Wuhuan (護烏桓校尉)
- In office ?–?

Master of Writing (尚書)
- In office 280–?

Gentleman of the Yellow Gate (黃門侍郎)
- In office February 266 or after – ?
- Monarch: Emperor Wu of Jin

Personal details
- Born: 232 Gu'an County, Hebei
- Died: 7 May 300 (aged 68)
- Spouse: Liu Fang's daughter
- Children: Zhang Yi; Zhang Wei
- Parent: Zhang Ping (father)
- Occupation: Poet, politician
- Courtesy name: Maoxian (茂先)
- Peerage: Marquis of Guangwu (廣武侯); Duke of Zhuangwu (壮武公)

Zhang Hua (232 – 7 May 300), courtesy name Maoxian, was a Chinese poet and politician of the Western Jin dynasty and the preceding state of Cao Wei. An accomplished poet, Zhang also authored the Bowuzhi, a compendium of entries about natural wonders and supernatural phenomena. His political career reached its zenith from 291 to 300, when he served as a leading minister during the de facto regency of Empress Jia Nanfeng over her husband Emperor Hui of Jin. Zhang was considered an effective minister and, in conjunction with his colleague Pei Wei, helped ensure a period of relative stability within the Jin court. As the court fell into factional disputes from 299 to 300, Zhang rebuffed the rebellious overtures of Emperor Hui's granduncle Sima Lun and was executed when the latter seized power from the empress.

== Background and service under Wei ==
Zhang Hua's father, Zhang Ping (張平), was a commandery administrator in the Cao Wei state during the Three Kingdoms period. He died when Zhang Hua was still young. Zhang Hua's family became impoverished, and he was a shepherd when he was young. The official Liu Fang (劉放), who was also from Zhang's hometown, was so impressed with Zhang Hua's talent that he arranged for Zhang Hua to marry his daughter. Lu Qin, grandson of Lu Zhi, who was from the same commandary, was similarly impressed with Zhang.

Zhang Hua became known for his literary talent, and he wrote a collection of poems, ostensibly about birds – but in fact about people's tendencies. His poems received great renown, with Ruan Ji sighing, "This man is capable of assisting princes!"; Ruan's assessment further increased Zhang's renown. The commandery administrator Xianyu Si (鲜于嗣) recommended him for the post of Academician in the Ministry of Ceremonies (太常博士). However, Lu Qin approached the regent Sima Zhao regarding Zhang's post; eventually, Sima Zhao made Zhang one of his secretaries, and he distinguished himself in that role.

== Service under the Jin dynasty ==
In 266, after Sima Zhao's son, Sima Yan (Emperor Wu) usurped the throne from the last Cao Wei emperor Cao Huan and established the Jin dynasty (266–420) in February, he appointed Zhang Hua as a Gentleman of the Yellow Gate (黃門侍郎) and awarded him the title of a Secondary Marquis (關內侯). He was promoted to the position of a Master of Writing (尚書) later. When the general Yang Hu encouraged Emperor Wu to conquer the Jin dynasty's rival state Eastern Wu, most officials strongly objected but Zhang Hua agreed with Yang Hu and became heavily involved in the strategies and logistic arrangements behind the campaign against Eastern Wu. In c.December 278, when Yang Hu was gravely ill, Emperor Wu sent Zhang to pay him a visit to ask for strategies on conquering Wu; Yang's advice was to launch the campaign swiftly, lest Sun Hao be replaced by a more competent ruler. Zhang agreed with Yang's assessment. On his part, Yang remarked that Zhang would be the person to complete his goal (of conquering Eastern Wu). After the Jin dynasty conquered Eastern Wu in May 280, Emperor Wu enfeoffed Zhang Hua as the Marquis of Guangwu (廣武侯) to honour him for his contributions. Liu Wei's uncle Liu Na was known for his appraisal of personalities; his comment on Zhang Hua was "I cannot understand Zhang Maoxian".

Zhang Hua soon fell out of favour with Emperor Wu. When Emperor Wu once asked him who could be a regent for his son Sima Zhong (later Emperor Hui), Zhang Hua recommended Emperor Wu's brother, Sima You (the Prince of Qi). Although Sima You was clearly capable of fulfilling that role, Emperor Wu was angry with Zhang Hua because he feared that Sima You might usurp the throne from Sima Zhong in the future since he had much support from the masses. The officials who previously opposed the campaign against Eastern Wu seized this opportunity to speak ill of Zhang Hua in front of Emperor Wu and cause him to fall out of the emperor's favour. Emperor Wu then sent Zhang Hua away to the northern frontier in You Province to serve as Colonel Who Protects the Wuhuan (護烏桓校尉) and General Who Stabilises the North (安北將軍). Zhang Hua performed well in office as he pacified the various non-Han Chinese peoples, such as the Wuhuan and Xianbei tribes, in the region. Although Emperor Wu considered summoning Zhang Hua back to the imperial capital Luoyang to serve in ministerial positions, he changed his mind every time after listening to officials who disliked Zhang Hua. As the Minister of Ceremonies (太常), he suffered disgrace when he was dismissed for negligence after one of the beams in the imperial ancestral temple broke. Thus, for the rest of Emperor Wu's reign, he attended court sessions as a marquis.

Following Emperor Wu's death in May 290, Zhang Hua was summoned back to Luoyang to serve as an Official of Ceremonies (太常卿), a position without actual power. His role was mainly to teach Sima Yu, the only son and heir apparent of the newly enthroned Sima Zhong (Emperor Hui). After Empress Jia Nanfeng overthrew Empress Dowager Yang and her father Yang Jun in a coup d'état in April 291, she entrusted Zhang Hua with greater responsibilities as Right Household Counsellor (右光祿大夫), Palace Attendant (侍中) and Supervisor of the Palace Writers (中書監). Some reasons behind Zhang Hua's swift ascent were that both Empress Jia and Jia Mi observed that Zhang did not hail from a powerful clan, he was not hostile to Empress Jia's regency and he was popular with other court officials. (Note: Perhaps ironically, Jia Chong, the empress's late father, once advocated executing Zhang Hua during the Conquest of Wu by Jin, per Jia Chong's and Zhang Hua's biographies in Book of Jin.) Despite his loyalty, Zhang Hua was worried about the rise of Empress Jia's kin, and he wrote an article "Nǚ Shi Zhen" as satire. Eventually, Empress Jia decided to enfeoff Zhang as the Duke of Zhuangwu Commandery. Initially, Zhang declined to accept the peerage numerous times, but after an edict from Empress Jia advising him, he decided to accept. In c.March 296, Zhang Hua was promoted to Minister of Works (司空), replacing Sima Huang the Prince of Xiapi, who had died earlier that month. Over the subsequent years, with Empress Jia Nanfeng in power (Note: Emperor Hui was merely a puppet emperor due to his intellectual disability.), Zhang Hua used his political skills to keep the various competing factions in check, in conjunction with Empress Jia's cousin Pei Wei.

== Death and aftermath ==
In early 300, the political firestorm became too big for Zhang Hua to handle after Empress Jia Nanfeng framed Sima Yu for treason in February and had him deposed. In April, fearing that Sima Yu would make a comeback, Empress Jia had him murdered. With Empress Jia's reputation damaged by the murder, Sima Lun (the Prince of Zhao), a granduncle of Emperor Hui, plotted a coup d'état to remove Empress Jia from power. He tried to persuade Zhang Hua to join him, but Zhang Hua was reluctant to do so. In May, after Sima Lun successfully overthrew Empress Jia, he had several of her supporters and associates (including Zhang Hua) executed along with their families.

Sima Lun then usurped the throne in February 301 and briefly ruled as emperor before he was overthrown in May. Sima You's son and successor Sima Jiong became the regent. An official named Zhi Yu (挚虞) petitioned Jiong to have Zhang Hua posthumously rehabilitated. Separately, an official from Zhang's dukedom of Zhuangwu, Zhu Dao (竺道), also sent Sima Ai, the Prince of Changsha, a similar petition. While Sima Jiong started the debate on Zhang's status, and many officials felt that Zhang had suffered injustice, there were those who felt that Zhang's punishment was justified, and no decision was made for a while. Zhang's rehabilitation came in 303, during the regency of Sima Ai, (Note: Sima Jiong was killed in January 303, during the 12th month of the 1st year of the Tai'an era.) where he was restored to his former titles and positions, although he was not given a posthumous name. (Note: While Zhang Hua was not given a posthumous name, the name of his peerage, "Zhuangwu", can be considered an unofficial posthumous name as per Yi Zhou Shu, both "Zhuang" and "Wu" are considered positive posthumous names.)

== Poetry and other works ==
Zhang Hua's poetry was admired by such people as Ruan Ji and Chen Liu (陳留). He was profoundly learned, and when he changed houses it took thirty carts to carry his library. Zhang Hua was the author of the Bowuzhi, a collection of articles on various topics of interest. It appears to have perished during the Song dynasty, and the modern work which passes under that name was probably compiled from extracts found in other books. The Old Book of Tang and New Book of Tang both attributed the authorship of Lieyi Zhuan to him. (Note: The Book of Sui recorded that Lieyi Zhuan was written by Cao Pi. However, the collection recorded events which supposedly occurred during the Zhengshi and Ganlu eras (of Cao Fang's and Cao Mao's reigns respectively). Qing-era scholar Yao Zhenzong (姚振宗) theorized that the collection was started by Cao Pi and then later continued/completed by Zhang Hua, but offered no evidence to support his claim.)

== Family and descendants ==
Zhang Hua had two sons: Zhang Yi (張禕), who served as a Regular Mounted Attendant (散騎常侍); Zhang Wei (張韙), who served as a Mounted Gentleman (散騎侍郎). Both of them died together with their father and the rest of their families in May 300. Only one of Zhang Hua's grandsons, Zhang Yu (張輿; son of Zhang Yi), survived the purge. He inherited his grandfather's peerage in 303, after his grandfather was posthumously rehabilitated. Zhang Yu's great-grandson Zhang Muzhi (张穆之) was the father of Zhang Shangrou (张尚柔), and the maternal grandfather of Emperor Wu of Liang. (Note: However, Zhang Shangrou's biography in Liang Shu contradicts itself by stating that her father Wang Muzhi was both a sixth-generation descendant of Zhang Hua and a great-grandson of Zhang Yu (Zhang Hua's grandson); if the latter is true, Zhang Muzhi would then be a fifth-generation descendant of Zhang Hua. Her biography in Nan Shi only mentioned that her father Wang Muzhi was a sixth-generation descendant of Zhang Hua.)

One of Zhang Hua's daughters was the spouse of Bian Cui (卞粹; died c.August 303). (Note: Per his son Bian Kun's (卞壸) biography in Jin Shu, Bian Cui was a son-in-law of Zhang Hua; it is unclear if Lady Zhang was Bian Kun's mother. Per Emperor Hui's biography in Jin Shu, Bian Cui was killed together with Li Han and Feng Sun (馮蓀) in the 7th month of the 2nd year of the Tai'an era; the month corresponds to 31 Jul to 28 Aug 303 in the Julian calendar.)

== See also ==
- Lists of people of the Three Kingdoms
