= Lady Guo (wife of Wang Yan) =

Cousin of Chinese empress Jia Nanfeng (died 300)

Lady Guo (died 300), was a Chinese businesswoman and influential imperial favorite.

Lady Guo was a daughter of Guo Yu (郭豫; courtesy name Taining (泰宁)); Guo Yu was a younger brother of Guo Zhan (郭展; courtesy name Taishu (泰舒)). Both Guo Yu and Guo Zhan were sons of Guo Pei, a younger brother of the Wei general Guo Huai. One of Guo Pei's daughters was married to Wei/Jin official Jia Chong.

Lady Guo was married to Wang Yan. She was also the cousin of empress Jia Nanfeng (daughter of Jia Chong), de facto regent of China during the reign of Jia's husband Emperor Hui of Jin. She was a favorite of her cousin the empress and became famous as a businesswoman when she used her position to accumulate a fortune through the beneficial contacts she acquired through her relationship with the empress.
