= Prince of Guangling =

Prince of Guangling may refer to:

- Princes of the Guangling Commandery during the Han period
- Sima Yu (278–300), Jin dynasty prince
- Emperor Xianzong of Tang (778–820), known as Prince of Guangling before he took the throne
