= Wang Yan (Jin dynasty) =

Chinese Jin dynasty minister (256-311)

- 王衍

Minister of Works (司空)
- In office 307 – 310
- Monarch: Emperor Huai of Jin

Minister Over the Masses (司徒)
- In office 308 – 311
- Monarch: Emperor Huai of Jin

Personal details
- Born: 256
- Died: 5 May 311
- Spouse(s): Lady Guo, grand-niece of Guo Huai
- Children: Wang Xuan; Wang Jingfeng; Wang Huifeng; Pei Xia's wife (Note: Pei Xia's wife was the mother of Pei Mu and maternal grandmother of Du Lingyang, empress of Emperor Cheng of Jin.)
- Parent: Wang Yi (father)
- Occupation: Politician
- Courtesy name: Yifu (夷甫)

Wang Yan (256 – 5 May 311), courtesy name Yifu, was a Chinese politician. A member of the Wang clan of Langya, he served as a minister and was one of the Qingtan leaders of the Western Jin. During the reign of Emperor Hui of Jin, Wang Yan grew popular among the court for his mastery in Qingtan and for being a patron of Xuanxue. Wang Yan vacillated between the warring princes during the War of the Eight Princes until he ended up with Sima Yue, who gave him a considerable amount of power in his administration. After Yue died in April 311, Wang Yan led his funeral procession but was ambushed and later executed by the Han-Zhao general, Shi Le at Ningping City (寧平; in modern Zhoukou, Henan). Though a bright scholar, Wang Yan was often associated by traditional historians as one of the root causes for Western Jin's demise due to his influential beliefs.

== Early life and career ==
Wang Yan was born in Langya commandery as part of the same Wang clan of Langya that his cousin Wang Rong, a member of the famous Seven Sages of the Bamboo Grove, came from. His grandfather was Wang Xiong (王雄; (Note: The exact relationship between Wang Xiong and Wang Xiang is unknown. A Wang Shi Pu annotation in Cui Lin's biography in Sanguozhi recorded that Wang Xiong belonged to the same clan (宗).) fl.220-235), a regional inspector (cishi) of You Prefecture (幽州刺史) under Cao Wei.

When he was 14 years old (by East Asian reckoning), he met with Yang Hu at Luoyang. Yang Hu and others were impressed with the way he spoke, while Wang was not overly deferential towards Yang despite his young age. He became the talk of the town, so much so that the minister Yang Jun wanted to marry him to his daughter. However, Wang Yan was not fond of Yang Jun, so he pretended to go mad to avoid him.

In 273, Emperor Wu of Jin was looking for talents to help safeguard the northern frontiers. Wang Yan enjoyed discussing military strategies and the School of Diplomacy, so for these reasons, he was recommended by Lu Qin (盧欽; grandson of Lu Zhi) to serve as the Administrator of Liaodong. Wang Yan was not pleased with his given position and refused to take it. It was then when Wang Yan decided to focus less on worldly affairs and dedicate his time on studying Qingtan or "pure conversations".

Wang Yan eventually left Luoyang to take up the post of Prefect of Yuanxiang (苑鄕, in present-day Hebei and Beijing). After some time, he returned to the capital and served a series of offices, eventually reaching Gentleman-Attendant of the Yellow Gate. By 297, during the reign of Emperor Hui, Wang Yan held the office of Prefect of the Masters of Writing, holding a significant amount of power in court at this time. He still regularly discussed Qingtan and further delved himself into Zhengshi era Xuanxue, particularly the teachings of the Cao Wei minister He Yan and his inner circle. He and another devotee, Yue Guang, were regarded as well-respected men and were thus able to spread their beliefs to the other ministers in the government. However, his ideas supposedly had a negative effect on the court, as many of the ministers began neglecting their duties in favour of committing excessive and absurd acts.

== War of the Eight Princes ==
In 299, Wang Yan became somewhat involved with the imperial family. Empress Jia Nanfeng, the paramount leader of Jin working behind her husband Emperor Hui of Jin, was becoming more cruel day by day. Her brother Jia Mo (賈模) plotted to assassinate her together with Pei Wei and Wang Yan. However, the plot was dropped after Wang Yan decided to pull out. (Note: This is based on Empress Jia's biography in the Book of Jin. Pei Wei's biography in the same records provides a completely different account, and it was Zhang Hua, not Wang Yan, who participated in the plot. Zizhi Tongjian followed the account in Pei Wei's biography.) Later, Wang Yan's younger daughter Wang Huifeng married the Crown Prince, Sima Yu but when Yu was reduced to a commoner and arrested by the Empress, Wang Yan had her divorced and refused to associate with him. His decision to do so backfired in May 300 when Jia Nanfeng was overthrown and replaced by Sima Lun as regent. A group of ministers submitted a petition accusing him of refusing to help Sima Yu in order to save his own life, and Wang Yan was barred from the government.

While Sima Lun was emperor, Wang Yan again pretended to be mad in order to avoid trouble, going as far as attacking his maids. After Sima Lun's fall, he returned to the government as Intendant of Henan. For the next few years of the War of the Eight Princes, Wang Yan appeared to have kept a neutral stance and was not closely affiliated with any of the warring princes. In 303, when Sima Ai (who became the new emperor's regent in late January that year after Sima Jiong's death) was besieged by Sima Ying's army in Luoyang, a group of ministers sent Wang Yan out to negotiate peace with Ying but ended in failure when Ying refused to accept it. In February 305, when Sima Yong removed Sima Ying as Crown Prince, Wang Yan was appointed by Yong as Supervisor of the Left of the Masters of Writing.

== Service under Sima Yue's regency ==
The Prince of Donghai, Sima Yue, was the last of the so-called Eight Princes to take control of the government in 306. Yue appointed Wang Yan Minister of Works on 8 Feb 307 and later Minister Over the Masses on 8 January 308. Although Yue had won the civil war, he must now face the growing threat of Han-Zhao, a Xiongnu state that emerged in northern China during the war in 304. After his appointment, Wang Yan alerted Sima Yue that he should secure two places to run away to if the court were to fall. Wang Yan recommended he appoint his younger brother Wang Cheng as Inspector of Jingzhou and kinsman Wang Dun as Inspector of Qingzhou. This was called the "three rabbit burrows strategy (狡兔三窟)". (Note: Sima Yue based himself in Xiang county near Xuchang. The strategy was that if the north were to fall, he can choose to flee to Jingzhou or Qingzhou where the trusted inspector can host him. The plan fell through due to the circumstances that befell the two men, but Wang Cheng and Wang Dun were able to amass so much power in the south because of this. Dun in particular grew so powerful that he became a threat to the Eastern Jin regime until his death in August 324.) (Note: The Zizhi Tongjian recorded that in c.312, Wang Cheng was eventually forced to relinquish his post of Inspector of Jingzhou and relocate to Jianye. On his way to Jianye, Wang Cheng offended Wang Dun, who then accused Cheng of consorting with Du Tao, and arranged for Cheng to be strangled.)

In 308, the powerful bandit, Wang Mi, aligned himself with Han and began marching towards Luoyang. Mi threw Qingzhou, Xuzhou, Yanzhou and Yuzhou into chaos and had Xuchang's armoury emptied for his soldiers. The court was greatly afraid as Wang Mi defeated the Jin forces at Huanyuan Pass. Sima Yue sent Wang Bin (王斌) while the Inspector of Liangzhou, Zhang Gui sent his general Beigong Chun to reinforce the capital. As Wang Mi's army were at the gates of Luoyang, an edict was passed to make Wang Yan the commander. Wang Yan, Wang Bin and Zhang Gui all went out to face Wang Mi with their army. Mi was greatly defeated and withdrew, but Wang Yan sent Wang Bing (王秉) to pursue him, dealing him another great defeat.

In 309, Wang Yan was made Grand Commandant to replace the retiring Liu Shi (劉寔). The next year in 310, Luoyang was suffering from a severe food shortage. Calls to reinforce the capital were met with silence. Many insisted that they move the capital instead to avoid both the famine and Han forces. However, Wang Yan did not think that was possible and sold his carriage and oxen to calm the people down. Later, Wang Yan became Sima Yue's Army Advisor.

== Downfall and death ==
In 311, tensions between Sima Yue and his powerful general Gou Xi reached its climax. Gou Xi, disgruntled at the fact that Sima Yue was believing in slanders regarding him, cooperated with Emperor Huai and retaliated against Yue. With Han growing day by day and now his strongest general turning on him, Yue was undergoing a severe amount of stress, and had Wang Yan take over the handling of affairs. Yue died shortly after in Xiang county (項縣; present-day Shenqiu County, Henan) but Wang Yan and the others agreed to keep his death a secret.

Yue's heir, Sima Pi (司馬毗), was in Luoyang at the time, so the ministers all decided to elect Wang Yan as the new head for the time being. Wang was reluctant to take the lead and offered it to Sima Fan (司馬範; Prince of Xiangyang and son of Sima Wei, Prince Yin of Chu), but he too refused. In the end, they all decided that they should carry out a funeral for their late prince in Donghai first. However, the Han general, Shi Le, knew about their plans and sent his cavalries to ambush them in Ningping City. A great number of Jin officials and soldiers were killed while Wang Yan, many imperial princes and other officials were captured. The captured prisoners were all brought into Shi Le's camp for questioning regarding Jin's condition.

Shi Le had heard of Wang Yan's talents and was happy when he received him. When Wang Yan met with Shi Le, Wang thoroughly explained to him the causes of Jin's downfall, citing its lack of preparation against the likes of Shi Le as one of it. He downplayed his role in the government and even tried to curry Shi Le's favour by urging him to become emperor. However, Shi Le told him, "You have supported the court ever since you were young; your fame spreads throughout the Four Seas, and you occupy a very important office. How can you speak as though you were some nobody? If you are not the one responsible for wrecking the realm, then who is?"

Shi Le then scheduled the prisoners for execution. Due to his refusal to take responsibility, Shi Le ordered that Wang Yan be executed by pushing a wall to crush him to death rather than by the sword. Before his death, Wang Yan was recorded to have lamented, "Though I am inferior to the ancients, had I not favoured vanity and devoted myself to bettering the state, I would not have suffer today." Later in July that year, Luoyang would fall to Han and Emperor Huai was taken captive during the Disaster of Yongjia.

== Appraisals ==
During his time, Wang Yan was viewed favourably by many of his contemporaries due to his knowledge of Qingtan and Xuanxue. His family members, Wang Rong, Wang Cheng, Wang Dun, and Wang Dao, had all made positive remarks in regard to him. However, there were those who were skeptical of him in spite of acknowledging his talents. Both Shan Tao and Yang Hu (Note: Yang had a complicated relationship with both Wang Yan and Wang Rong. Besides Yang's skepticism of Wang Yan's abilities, during the Battle of Xiling, Yang nearly executed Wang Rong for violating military law. Thus, the Wang cousins hated Yang and often defamed the latter; people at the time commented that while the Wang cousins held influence, Yang was deemed to be without de.) commented that while Wang was indeed intelligent, they feared that Wang might not use his strengths for the better good.

After the Disaster of Yongjia, Wang's reputation soured as many blamed him for being one of the reasons why Western Jin fell. The Jin general, Yu Yi wrote a letter to Yin Hao asking him to quit his life as a hermit and join the government. In it, he brings up Wang Yan who he criticized for neglecting government responsibilities in favour of philosophical discussions and failing to make a positive name for himself, much like what Yin Hao was doing at the time. During his 2nd northern expedition in 356, the Jin commander Huan Wen reportedly said, "For causing the Sacred Lands to fall into the hands of the enemies and lay it in ruins for a hundred years, Wang Yifu and his followers must bear this burden!"

Traditional historians and writers also cast a negative light on Wang Yan. Most of this stems from his association with Qingtan and Xuanxue. The Confucianist scholar, Fan Ning, made a very critical assessment against Wang, denouncing him of distorting the orthodox teachings of Confucius which in turn brought disaster to his dynasty. Some even extended Wang Yan's faults to He Yan and other followers of Neo-Taoism like Wang Rong and Ruan Ji. This hostile sentiment was shared by the Book of Jin and various famous writers from different dynasties such as Wei Yuanzhong, Su Shi, Wang Fuzhi and more.

The Chinese saying "Randomly speaking out orpiment (口中雌黃)" (Note: Orpiment was used as a correction fluid in ancient China. To speak out orpiment is as if to constantly correct oneself when they speak.) is attributed to him. Wang was prone to making mistakes whenever he spoke as he was always in a carefree and relaxed state of mind. Whenever this happened, he would calmly go back and say what he intended to say. Initially, this idiom simply referred to people who constantly have to repeat what they say to rectify themselves. Gradually, however, it was extended to refer to people who spout nonsense with no proof to back them up.
