= Sima Yao (Sixuan) =

Western Jin Prince of Dong'an (died 304)

Sima Yao 司馬繇

Prince of Dong'an (东安王)
- Reign: 4–12 May 291 c.November 301 – 18 September 304
- Successor: Sima Hun (司马浑)
- Born: Unknown (Note: Sima Yao's eldest brother Sima Jin was born in 256, as he died aged 34 in March 290.)
- Died: 18 September 304; Yecheng, Hebei
- Issue: None
Names
- Family name: Sima (司馬); Given name: Yao (繇); Courtesy name: Sixuan (思玄)
Posthumous name
- none
- House: House of Sima
- Father: Sima Zhou
- Mother: Lady Zhuge

Sima Yao (simplified Chinese: 司马繇; traditional Chinese: 司馬繇; died 18 September 304), courtesy name Sixuan (思玄), was a son of Sima Zhou, Prince Wu of Langya, and his wife Lady Zhuge (a daughter of Zhuge Dan), and a grandson of Sima Yi, regent of the Cao Wei state during the Three Kingdoms era. Besides his heritage, Sima Yao was best known for his role in the death of Wen Yang, and his further involvement in the War of the Eight Princes during the reign of his cousin's son, Emperor Hui of Jin.

== Background and life under Emperor Wu ==
Sima Yao was born to Sima Zhou and his wife Lady Zhuge in an unknown year after 256, as the third son out of a total of four. When he was young, he was made a teacher who taught the classics to the crown prince Sima Zhong; other such teachers include Yang Miao (杨邈) and his second cousin Sima Yue. In June 283, Sima Zhou died, and his eldest son Sima Jin succeeded him as Prince of Langya. Yao was made Duke of Dong'an on 22 December 289 during his cousin Emperor Wu's last bestowment of titles to members of the Sima clan; he was probably in his 20s at the time. Less than three months later, in early March 290, Sima Jin died and was succeeded by his son Sima Rui (the future Emperor Yuan of Jin.)

== During Emperor Hui's reign ==
About two months after Sima Rui inherited his princedom, Emperor Wu died. Emperor Wu's successor, Emperor Hui was developmentally disabled; his reign saw a series of regents who ruled on his behalf. Sima Yao held some minor positions during the regency of Yang Jun, father of Emperor Wu's second empress Empress Yang Zhi. During the coup to oust Yang Jun on 23 April 291, Sima Yao led a contingent of 400 troops against Yang. During the trial of Yang Jun's brother Yang Yao (杨珧), Yao pleaded that there was a memorial inside a stone box which could save him, and that Sima Yao can ask Zhang Hua to verify the information. (Note: Earlier in Tongjian, it was recorded that after Yang Zhi was made empress in Dec 276, Yang Yao submitted a memorial to Emperor Wu. In it, he wrote, "Since ancient times, whenever a clan had produced two empresses, not all its members would be able to survive. As such, I beseech (Your Majesty) to allow this memorial to be stored in the ancestral temple of the Yang clan; in the future, should what I have written come to pass, this memorial would be able to prevent disaster." Emperor Wu agreed.) Separately, others suggested that Yao be treated leniently, as was the case with Zhong Yu's sons when their uncle Zhong Hui rebelled against Sima Zhao; Sima Yao did not heed the advice. The cronies of Empress Jia Nanfeng then tortured Yang Yao, causing him to cry out in agony. Eventually, an executioner cut open Yang Yao's head with a blade. As Zhuge Dan's maternal grandson, Sima Yao was concerned about Wen Yang; he eventually claimed that Wen was part of Yang Jun's rebellion and had him executed. For that night, punishments and rewards arising from the coup were all handled by Sima Yao, and his fame grew. Wang Rong advised, "After such a major incident, it is good to think deeply about future developments."; Sima Yao did not heed Wang's advice.

On 4 May, due to his contributions, Sima Yao's peerage was promoted to the Prince of Dong'an. However, Jia Nanfeng was wary of him, as he plotted to overthrow her. Sima Yao's elder brother Sima Dan (司马澹) the Duke of Dongwu was on bad terms with him; Sima Dan then repeatedly mentioned to their uncle Sima Liang (who was regent together with Wei Guan) that Yao was monoplising the power to give rewards and punishments, and that he aimed to interfere in court affairs. Sima Liang then relieved Yao of his post on 12 May; Yao was later exiled on grounds of sedition.

By the time Sima Yao was reappointed Prince of Dong'an in c.November 301, the situation in both the Jin court and the empire itself had changed dramatically. Sima Liang, Wei Guan, Sima Wei, Empress Jia and her clique, and Sima Lun and his clique were all dead; Sima Jiong, the Prince of Qi, was now regent. In the northwest, Qi Wannian's rebellion had been quelled for about two and a half years, but the refugee situation it created continued to simmer. In 301, Li Te declared his rebellion in Yizhou.

During Sima Jiong's regency, Sima Zhou's widow Princess Dowager Zhuge petitioned him, claiming that Sima Dan was unfilial, and requested that Sima Yao be allowed to return from exile. Sima Jiong agreed; Sima Dan was then exiled to Liaodong together with his family. When he returned to court, Sima Yao also recommended Sima Mao (司马楙), Prince of Dongping and son of Sima Wang, to the Jin court; Sima Mao was made General who Pacifies the East and Chief Controller of Xuzhou, and sent to garrison Xiapi. (Note: According to Sima Mao's biography in Book of Jin, he was on good terms with Sima Yao and it was because of this friendship that Mao survived Yang Jun's fall as he had been supporting Yang. However, it was also because of this friendship that he was also relieved of his posts in May 291 and sent to his fiefdom.)

The next mention of Sima Yao was in August 304, where he was at Yecheng for the funeral of his mother Princess Dowager Zhuge. By then, another two of Emperor Hui's regents were dead: Sima Jiong, who was executed after his defeat in January 303, and Sima Ai, Emperor Hui's half-brother, who was burnt to death in March 304. Sima Ying, also Emperor Hui's half-brother, was now regent. On 20 August 304, Sima Yue, Prince of Donghai, led a coalition of more than 10000 troops to attack Yecheng, which was Sima Ying's stronghold; he also brought Emperor Hui along. With Yecheng in an uproar, Sima Ying met his officials to discuss a strategy. Sima Yao told Ying, "Now that the Son of Heaven is leading the attack, it is best to disarm, don mourning clothing and leave the city to receive him and ask for forgiveness." Sima Ying did not heed Yao, and prepared to resist Yue.

Sima Ying was successful in fighting off Yue's army. After his victory, he was resentful of Sima Yao for his advice. In September, Sima Yao was arrested and executed. After his death, Sima Jin's son Sima Hun (司马浑) was made Prince of Dong'an, but Hun died shortly after becoming prince, and the princedom of Dong'an was allowed to lapse.
