= Pei Xiu =

Chinese cartographer and geographer (224-271)

- 裴秀

Minister of Works (司空)
- In office 268 – 271
- Monarch: Emperor Wu of Jin

Prefect of the Masters of Writing (尚書令)
- In office 265 – 268
- Monarch: Emperor Wu of Jin

Supervisor of the Masters of Writing (尚書僕射)
- In office 260 – 265
- Monarch: Cao Huan

Military Adviser (參謀)
- In office 257 – 260
- Monarch: Cao Mao

Major (司馬) (under Sima Zhao)
- In office c. 250s – 257
- Monarch: Cao Fang / Cao Mao

Gentleman of the Yellow Gate (黃門侍郎)
- In office ? – c. 250s
- Monarch: Cao Fang

Personal details
- Born: 224 Wenxi County, Shanxi
- Died: 3 April 271 (aged 47)
- Spouse: Guo Pei's (Note: brother of Guo Huai) daughter
- Relations: Pei Mao (grandfather); Pei Hui (uncle) (Note: Pei Hui and his son Pei Kang were ancestors of Pei Songzhi.)
- Children: Pei Jun; Pei Wei
- Parent: Pei Qian (Note: Pei Qian has a biography in vol.23 of Sanguozhi.) (father)
- Occupation: Cartographer, geographer, politician, writer
- Courtesy name: Jiyan (季彥)
- Peerage: Duke of Julu (鉅鹿公)

Pei Xiu
- Chinese: 裴秀
Transcriptions
Standard Mandarin
- Hanyu Pinyin: Péi Xiù
- Wade–Giles: P'ei^{2} Hsiu^{4}
- IPA: [pʰěɪ ɕjôʊ]

Jiyan (courtesy name)
- Chinese: 季彥
Transcriptions
Standard Mandarin
- Hanyu Pinyin: Jìyàn
- Wade–Giles: Chi^{4}-yen^{4}
- IPA: [ʈʂʰɻ̩̂jɛ̂n]

Pei Xiu (224–3 April 271), courtesy name Jiyan, was a Chinese cartographer, geographer, politician, and writer of the state of Cao Wei during the late Three Kingdoms period and Jin dynasty of China. He was very much trusted by Sima Zhao, and participated in the suppression of Zhuge Dan's rebellion. Following Sima Yan taking the throne of the newly established Jin dynasty, he and Jia Chong had Cao Huan deprived of his position to accord to the will of heaven. In the year 268, Pei Xiu was appointed as the Minister of Works in the Jin government.

Pei Xiu outlined and analysed the advancements of cartography, surveying and mathematics up until his time. He criticised earlier Han dynasty maps for their lack of precision and quality when representing scale and measured distances, although 20th century archaeological excavations and findings of maps predating the third century prove otherwise. There is also evidence that Zhang Heng (78–139) was the first to establish the grid reference system in Chinese cartography.

== As a cartographer ==
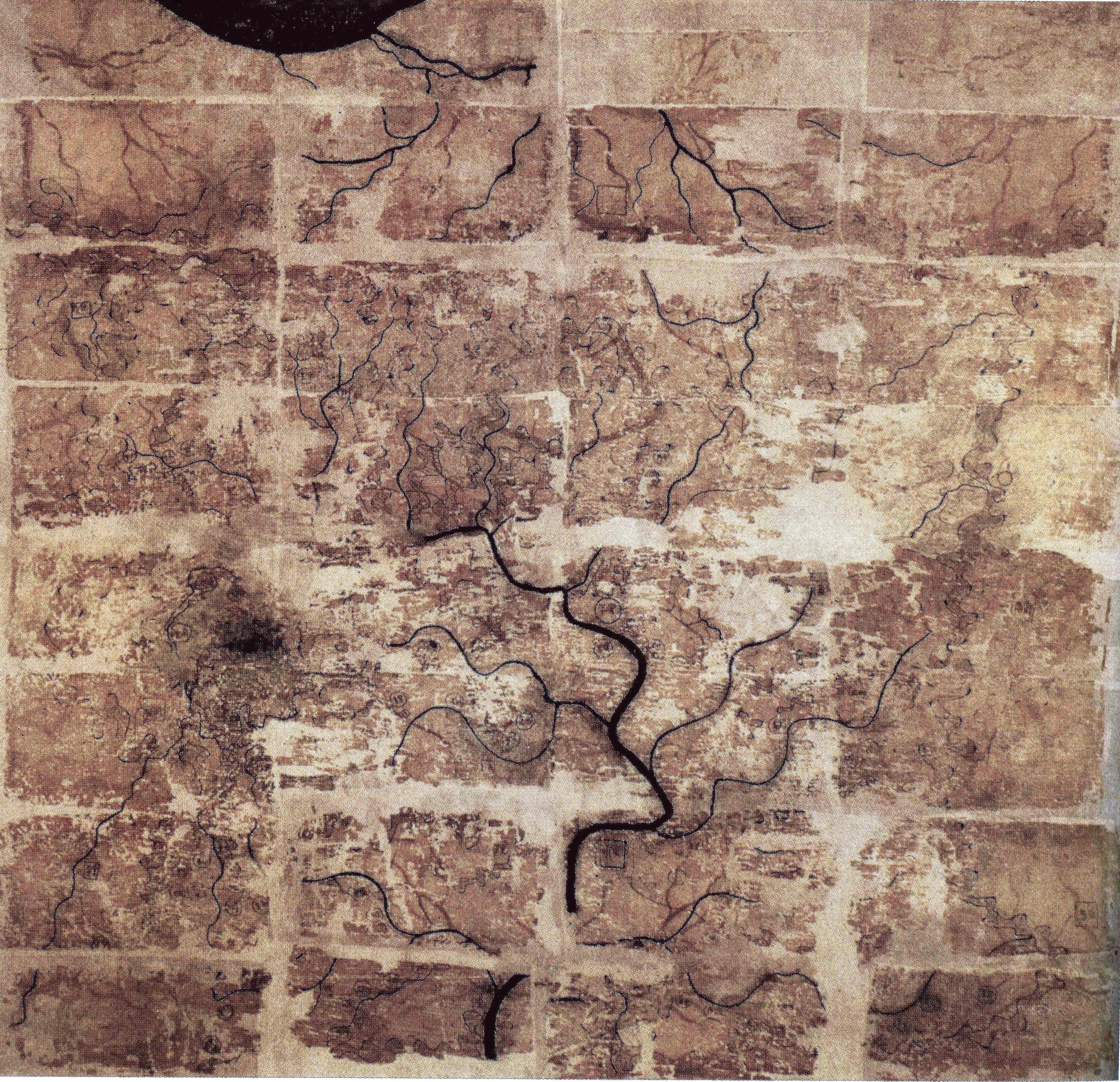
An early Western Han dynasty (202 BCE – 9 CE) silk map found in tomb 3 of Mawangdui Han tombs site, depicting the Kingdom of Changsha and Kingdom of Nanyue in southern China (note: the south direction is oriented at the top, north at the bottom).

Pei Xiu is best known for his work in cartography. Although professional map-making and use of the grid had existed in China before him, he was the first to mention a plotted geometrical grid reference and graduated scale displayed on the surface of maps to gain greater accuracy in the estimated distance between different locations. Historian Howard Nelson asserts that there is ample written evidence that Pei Xiu derived the idea of the grid reference from the map of Zhang Heng (78–139 CE), a polymath inventor and statesman of the Eastern Han period. Robert Temple asserts that Zhang Heng should also be credited as the first to establish the mathematical grid in cartography, as evidenced by his work in maps, the titles of his lost books, and the hint given in the Book of Later Han (i.e. Zhang Heng "cast a network of coordinates about heaven and earth, and reckoned on the basis of it"). Xiu also created a set of large-area maps that were drawn to scale. He produced a set of principles that stressed the importance of consistent scaling, directional measurements, and adjustments in land measurements in the terrain that was being mapped.

The preface to Pei Xiu's written work was preserved in the 35th volume of the Book of Jin, which is the official history for the Jin dynasty and one of the Twenty-Four Histories. It was written in the Book of Jin that Pei Xiu made a critical study of ancient texts in order to update the naming conventions of geographic locations described in old texts. His maps – drawn on rolls of silk – were presented to Emperor Wu, who preserved them in the imperial court's archives. Pei Xiu's maps have since been lost, decayed or destroyed. Yet the oldest existing terrain maps from China date to the fourth century BCE, found in a Qin tomb in present-day Gansu in 1986. Han dynasty maps from the second century BCE were found earlier in the 1973 excavation of Mawangdui.

In 1697, the Qing dynasty cartographer Hu Wei (胡渭) reconstructed Pei Xiu's maps in his Yugong Zhuizhi (禹貢錐指, A Few Points on the Vast Subject of the Yu Gong). Modern scholars have also used Pei Xiu's writing to reproduce his works, and historians such as Herrmann have compared Pei Xiu to other great ancient cartographers such as the Greek cartographer Ptolemy (83–161).

== Written works ==
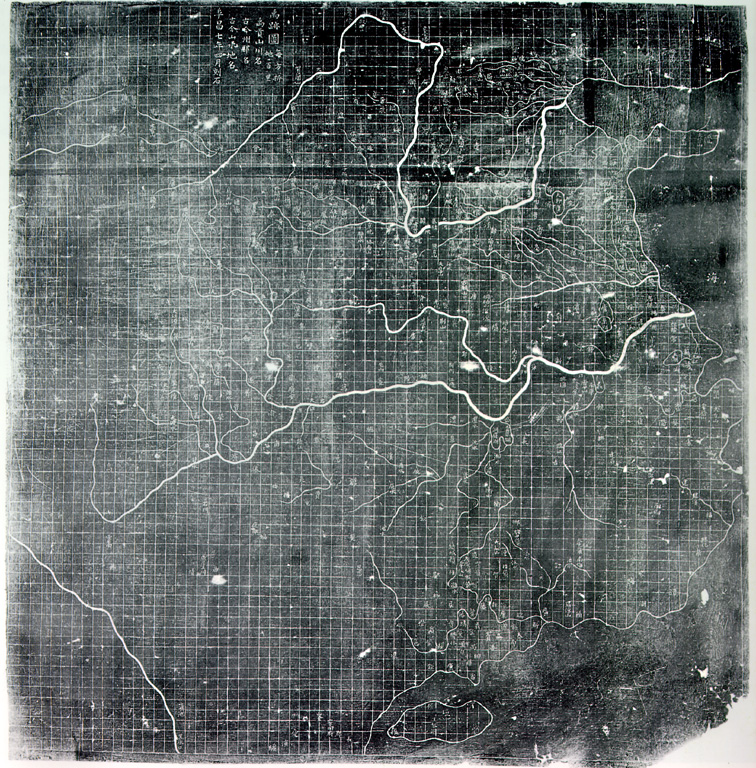
The Yu Ji Tu, or Map of the Tracks of Yu Gong, carved into stone in 1137, located in the Stele Forest of Xi'an. This three feet squared map features a graduated scale of 100 li for each rectangular grid. China's coastline and river systems are clearly defined and precisely pinpointed on the map. Yu Gong is in reference to the work of the Chinese deity Yu the Great described in the geographical chapter of the Book of Documents, dated fifth century BCE.

Pei Xiu wrote a preface to his maps with essential background information regarding older maps in China. He also provided a great deal of criticism about the existing maps from the Han dynasty in his time. Later Chinese ideas about the quality of maps made during the Han dynasty and before stem from the assessment given by Pei Xiu, which was not a positive one. Pei Xiu noted that the extant Han maps at his disposal were of little use since they featured too many inaccuracies and exaggerations in measured distance between locations. However, the Qin maps and Mawangdui maps of the Han dynasty discovered by modern archaeologists were far superior in quality than those examined and criticised by Pei Xiu. It was not until the 20th century that Pei Xiu's third century assessment of earlier maps' dismal quality would be overturned and disproven. The makers of the Han maps were familiar with the use of scale, while the Qin map makers had pinpointed the course of rivers with some accuracy. What these earlier maps did not feature was topographical elevation, which Pei Xiu would outline with his six principles of cartography.

Pei Xiu's preface describes geographers in the Xia, Shang and Zhou dynasties, although the earliest known geographical work was the Yu Gong chapter of the Shu Ji or Book of Documents, compiled in the fifth century BCE during the mid Zhou period. Pei Xiu also referred to Xiao He (died 193), who assembled the maps made during the fall of the Qin dynasty. This was done after the founder of the Han dynasty, Liu Bang (died 195 BC), had sacked the city of Xianyang. Pei Xiu states:

The origin of maps and geographical treatises goes back into former ages. Under the three dynasties (Xia, Shang and Zhou) there were special officials for this (guoshi). Then, when the Han sacked Xianyang, Xiao He collected all the maps and documents of the Qin. Now it is no longer possible to find the old maps in the secret archives, and even those Xiao He found are missing. We only have maps, both general and local, from the (Later) Han time. None of these employs a graduated scale (fenlü) and none of them are arranged on a rectangular grid (zhunwang). Moreover, none of them gives anything like a complete representation of the celebrated mountains and the great rivers; their arrangement is very rough and imperfect, and one cannot rely on them. Indeed some of them contain absurdities, irrelevancies and exaggerations, which are not in accord with reality, and which should be banished by good sense.

Pei Xiu continues his preface with short background information on the conquests by the Jin dynasty and the impressive maps commissioned by Sima Zhao (211–264). He then described the methods he used to create new maps while examining the ancient text of the Yu Gong or Tribute of Yu to create historical maps:

The assumption of power by the great Jin dynasty has unified space in all the six directions. To purify its territory, it began with Yong and Shu (Gansu and Sichuan) and penetrated deeply into their regions, though full of obstacles. Emperor Wen then ordered the appropriate officials to draw up maps of Wu and Shu. After Shu had been conquered and the maps were examined, with regard to the distances from one another of mountains, rivers, and places, the positions of plains and declivities, and the lines of the roads, whether straight or curved, which the six armies had followed; it was found that there was not the slightest error. Now, referring back to antiquity, I have examined according to the Yu Gong the mountains and lakes, the courses of the rivers, the plateaus and plains, the slopes and marshes, the limits of the nine ancient provinces and the sixteen modern ones, taking account of commanderies and fiefs, prefectures and cities, and not forgetting the names of places where the ancient kingdoms concluded treaties or held meetings; and lastly, inserting the roads, paths and navigable waters, I have made this map in eighteen sheets.

Pei Xiu outlined six principles that should be observed when creating a map. He then defended his position and each of the six principles with a short explanation as to how they provide better accuracy in map-making and cartography. The first three principles outlined the use of scale (fenlü), direction (zhunwang) and road distance (daoli), while the last three principles are used to properly calculate distances on uneven terrain as represented on a flat, two dimensional map. Pei Xiu states:

In making a map there are six observable principles: (1) the graduated divisions, which are the means of determining the map's scale; (2) the rectangular grid (of parallel lines in two dimensions), which is the way of depicting correct relations between various parts of the map; (3) pacing out the sides of right-angled triangles, which is the way of fixing the lengths of derived distances (i.e., the third side of the triangle, which cannot be walked over); (4) (measuring) the high and the low; (5) (measuring) right angles and acute angles; (6) (measuring) curves and straight lines. These three principles are used according to the nature of the terrain, and are the means by which one reduces what are really plains and hills (literally cliffs) to distances on a plane surface... If one draws a map without graduated divisions, there is no means of distinguishing between what is near and what is far. If one has graduated divisions, but no rectangular grid or network of lines, then while one may attain accuracy in one corner of the map, one will certainly lose it elsewhere (i.e. in the middle, far from guiding marks). If one has a rectangular grid, but has not worked upon the [third] principle, then when it is a case of places in difficult country, among mountains, lakes or seas (which cannot be traversed directly by the surveyor), one cannot ascertain how they are related to one another. If one has adopted the [third] principle, but has not taken account of the high and the low, the right angles and acute angles, and the curves and straight lines, then the figures for distances indicated on the paths and roads will be far from the truth, and one will lose the accuracy of the rectangular grid. However, if we examine a map prepared by the combination of all these principles, we find that a true scale representation of the distances is fixed by the graduated divisions. So also the reality of the relative positions is attained by the use of paced sides of right-angled triangles; and the true scale of degrees and figures is reproduced by the determinations of high and low, angular dimensions, and curved or straight lines. Thus even if there are great obstacles in the shape of high mountains or vast lakes, huge distances or strange places, necessitating climbs and descents, retracting of steps or detours — everything can be taken into account and determined. When the principle of the rectangular grid is properly applied, then the straight and the curved, near and the far, can conceal nothing of their form from us.

== See also ==
- Lists of people of the Three Kingdoms
