= Guo Huai =

Chinese Cao Wei state general (died 255)

- 郭淮

General of Chariots and Cavalry (車騎將軍)
- In office June or July 250 – 23 February 255
- Monarch: Cao Fang / Cao Mao
- Preceded by: Wang Ling

General Who Attacks the West (征西將軍)
- In office 249 – June or July 250
- Monarch: Cao Fang

General of the Vanguard (前將軍)
- In office 240 – 249
- Monarch: Cao Fang

General of the Left (左將軍)
- In office 240
- Monarch: Cao Fang

Inspector of Yong Province (雍州刺史)
- In office 220 – 255
- Monarch: Cao Pi / Cao Rui / Cao Fang / Cao Mao

Major (司馬)
- In office 215–220
- Monarch: Emperor Xian of Han
- Chancellor: Cao Cao

Personal details
- Born: 180s CE Yangqu County, Shanxi
- Died: 23 February 255 (Note: The Sanguozhi recorded that Guo Huai died on the guiwei day of the 1st month of the 2nd year in the Zhengyuan era of Cao Mao's reign. This date corresponds to 23 February 255 in the Gregorian calendar.)
- Spouse: Wang Ling's sister
- Children: Guo Tong; at least four other sons
- Parent: Guo Yun (father)
- Relatives: Guo Pei (brother); Guo Zhen (brother); Guo Liang (brother); Guo Huai (niece)
- Occupation: Military general
- Courtesy name: Boji (伯濟)
- Posthumous name: Marquis Zhen (貞侯)
- Peerage: Marquis of Yangqu (陽曲侯)

Guo Huai (died 23 February 255), courtesy name Boji, was a Chinese military general of the state of Cao Wei during the Three Kingdoms period of China. He started his career towards the end of the Eastern Han dynasty under the warlord Cao Cao as a subordinate of Cao Cao's generals Xiahou Yuan and Zhang He. During the Three Kingdoms period, he served in Wei, the state established by Cao Cao's son Cao Pi, and lived through the reigns of four Wei emperors (Cao Pi, Cao Rui, Cao Fang and Cao Mao). From the 220s until his death in 255, he governed and defended Wei's western borders in Yong and Liang provinces (covering parts of present-day Gansu, Shaanxi, Ningxia, Qinghai and Inner Mongolia). During this time, he resisted multiple invasions by Wei's rival state, Shu Han, and quelled some rebellions by local Qiang, Di and other non-Han Chinese tribes.

== Family background ==
Guo Huai was from Yangqu County (陽曲縣), Taiyuan Commandery, which is located southwest of present-day Yangqu County, Shanxi. His grandfather Guo Quan (郭全) and father Guo Yun (郭縕) served as the Grand Minister of Agriculture (大司農) and Administrator (太守) of Yanmen Commandery (near present-day Xinzhou, Shanxi) respectively in the Eastern Han dynasty.

Guo Huai started his career in the middle of the Jian'an era (196–220) of Emperor Xian's reign in the late Eastern Han dynasty. He was nominated as a xiaolian (civil service candidate) and was subsequently appointed as an assistant official in Pingyuan Commandery.

== Service under Cao Cao ==
When Cao Pi held the position of General of the Household for All Purposes (五官中郎將) between 211 and 220, he recruited Guo Huai to serve as an officer in the law enforcement bureau under his charge. Guo Huai was later reassigned to be a clerk in the military affairs bureau of the office of the Imperial Chancellor, the position held by Cao Pi's father Cao Cao, the warlord who controlled the Han central government and the figurehead Emperor Xian since 196.

In 215, Guo Huai accompanied Cao Cao on a campaign against a rival warlord, Zhang Lu, in Hanzhong Commandery. After defeating Zhang Lu and capturing Hanzhong Commandery, Cao Cao left his general Xiahou Yuan behind to guard Hanzhong against possible attacks by another rival warlord, Liu Bei, who was in the nearby Yi Province (covering present-day Sichuan and Chongqing). Guo Huai also remained in Hanzhong and served as a Major (司馬) under Xiahou Yuan's command.

In 217, Liu Bei launched a campaign to seize control of Hanzhong Commandery from Cao Cao's forces. Guo Huai did not participate in the initial battles as he was ill. After Xiahou Yuan was killed in action at the Battle of Mount Dingjun in 219, there was much panic and fear among Cao Cao's forces in Hanzhong as they had lost their commander. Guo Huai managed to restore order and stability within Cao Cao’s forces in two ways: First, he gathered and regrouped the soldiers who scattered when Xiahou Yuan was killed. Second, he nominated Zhang He to replace Xiahou Yuan as the commander of Cao Cao's forces in Hanzhong.

The following day, when Cao Cao's forces received news that Liu Bei's forces were preparing to cross the Han River to attack them, most of Cao Cao's officers suggested that they should make camp on the riverbank and take advantage of the river as a natural barrier to resist the enemy, who had superiority in numbers. Guo Huai disagreed and said: "This isn't the best move because it reveals our weakness to the enemy and can't deter them. Why don't we make camp further away from the river, lure the enemy to attack our camp, and strike back when they are halfway across? We can defeat Liu Bei if we do this." Zhang He and the other officers followed Guo Huai's plan. When Liu Bei saw that the enemy camp was further away from the river, he became suspicious and did not send his troops across the river to attack. Guo Huai also ordered his troops to strengthen their defences and show Liu Bei's forces that they were prepared to hold their ground. Cao Cao was very pleased when he heard about what Guo Huai did. He also approved Zhang He's command and ordered Guo Huai to continue serving as a Major under Zhang He.

== Service under Cao Pi ==
Following Cao Cao's death in March 220, his son Cao Pi succeeded him as the Imperial Chancellor and vassal King of Wei (魏王) under the Eastern Han dynasty. Cao Pi awarded Guo Huai the title of a Secondary Marquis (關內侯) and reassigned him to be the Chief Clerk (長史) under the General Who Guards the West (鎮西將軍).

Later that year, Cao Pi appointed Guo Huai as acting Army Protector Who Attacks the Qiang (征羌護軍) and ordered him to join Zhang He and Yang Qiu in leading imperial forces to attack Zheng Gan's (鄭甘) bandit forces and the Lushui barbarians (盧水胡) in the Guanzhong region. They succeeded in their mission and restored peace and stability in the Guanzhong region.

In late 220, Cao Pi usurped the throne from Emperor Xian, ended the Eastern Han dynasty, and established the Cao Wei (or Wei) state with himself as the new emperor. As Guo Huai fell sick on his journey to the imperial capital Luoyang and had to rest until he was well, he showed up late to congratulate Cao Pi on his coronation. Later, while hosting a banquet to celebrate his coronation, Cao Pi sternly asked Guo Huai in front of all the guests: "In the past, when Yu the Great called the nobles to attend an assembly at Tushan, Fangfeng showed up late and was executed as punishment. Today, you showed up late for the festivities. Why is that so?" Guo Huai replied: "I heard that the Five Emperors taught and ruled their people by virtue. The use of punishments started in the Xia dynasty when its rule began to weaken. Today, as I am living in an age comparable to that of Yao and Shun's time, I know that I won't face the same fate as Fangfeng."

Cao Pi was so pleased to hear Guo Huai's response that he appointed him as the acting Inspector (刺史) of Yong Province and enfeoffed him as the Marquis of Sheyang Village (射陽亭侯). Guo Huai was officially commissioned as the Inspector of Yong Province about five years later. Sometime between 220 and 226, Guo Huai led Wei forces to suppress a rebellion by the Qiang chieftain Biti (辟蹏) in Anding Commandery (安定郡; around present-day Zhenyuan County, Gansu). Whenever the Qiang and other tribal leaders in Yong Province expressed their willingness to submit to Wei rule, Guo Huai always sent his subordinates to gather information about their clans (e.g. demographics) first. When he spoke to the leaders, he surprised and impressed them with his knowledge about their clans. He also paid close attention to, and showed understanding towards the concerns they had. The people in Yong Province praised him as a brilliant and wise governor.

== Service under Cao Rui ==
In 228, Wei's rival state Shu Han (or Shu) launched the first of a series of invasions on Wei territories in Yong Province. Zhuge Liang, the Imperial Chancellor of Shu, led the campaign and deployed his troops at Mount Qi (祁山; the mountainous areas around present-day Li County, Gansu). He then sent Ma Su to lead the Shu vanguard to attack Jieting (街亭; in present-day Qin'an County, Gansu) and Gao Xiang to lead another force to station at Liucheng (柳城; in present-day Zhangjiachuan, Gansu) as backup for Ma Su. In response to this invasion, Zhang He led an army to attack Ma Su at the Battle of Jieting and inflicted a devastating defeat on the enemy. At the same time, Guo Huai also led a force to attack Gao Xiang's camp at Liucheng and succeeded in destroying it. Guo Huai then followed up by attacking Tangti (唐蹏), a rebellious Qiang tribal chief from Longxi Commandery (around present-day Longxi County, Gansu), and defeated him at Fuhan County (枹罕縣; southwest of present-day Linxia County, Gansu). The Wei government granted him the additional appointment of General Who Establishes Might (建威將軍) to honour him for his achievements.

=== Battle of Jianwei ===
In the spring of 229, when Shu forces led by Chen Shi attacked Wudu (武都; around present-day Cheng County, Gansu) and Yinping (陰平; present-day Wen County, Gansu) commanderies, Guo Huai led Wei forces to resist them. However, he retreated after Zhuge Liang led a Shu army to Jianwei (建威; in present-day Longnan, Gansu) as backup for Chen Shi. The Shu forces then conquered Wudu and Yinping commanderies.

=== Battle of Mount Qi ===
In 231, during the Battle of Mount Qi between Wei and Shu, when the Wei army ran short of food supplies, the Wei government considered transporting food supplies from the Guanzhong region to the frontline at Longxi Commandery because the granaries in Longxi were empty. Guo Huai turned to the local Qiang and Di tribes for aid and managed to convince them to donate food supplies to the Wei army. He then allocated them accordingly such that all units had sufficient food supplies. The Wei government reassigned him from his position as General Who Establishes Might (建威將軍) to General Who Spreads Martial Might (揚武將軍).

=== Battle of Wuzhang Plains ===
In 234, Guo Huai joined Sima Yi in leading Wei forces to resist another Shu invasion led by Zhuge Liang. When Sima Yi and his troops were stationed at the south of the Wei River, Guo Huai urged them to move to the plains on the north bank of the river as he foresaw that Zhuge Liang would attempt to seize the plains. When the other officers disagreed, Guo Huai said, "If Zhuge Liang crosses the Wei River and occupies those plains, his troops will have access to the mountains in the north. If they block the road through the mountains, it will cause fear and panic among the people living in the region. This isn't helpful to our State." Sima Yi agreed with Guo Huai and sent him to occupy the plains. While Guo Huai and his men were building a camp on the plains, they came under attack by Shu forces but managed to drive them back.

Several days later, when Guo Huai received news that Zhuge Liang was planning to launch an attack in the west, his subordinates wanted to strengthen the defences in the west. Guo Huai was the only one who recognised that it was a ruse, and that Zhuge Liang was actually planning to attack Yangsui (陽遂; the area north of the Wei River in present-day Mei and Fufeng counties, Shaanxi). He was proven right later as the Shu forces attacked Yangsui at night. However, as Guo Huai had set up defences earlier, the Shu forces failed to capture Yangsui.

== Service under Cao Fang ==
In 240, the Shu general Jiang Wei continued Zhuge Liang's aggressive foreign policy towards Wei and launched the first of a series of invasions of Wei. Guo Huai led Wei forces to repel the invaders at Longxi Commandery and forced them into the territory of the Qiang tribes. After Jiang Wei and his troops retreated back to Shu, Guo Huai followed up by attacking the Qiang tribes led by Midang (迷當). He also managed to pacify more than 3,000 Di clans in the region and resettled them in the Guanzhong region. The Wei government promoted him to General of the Left (左將軍) in recognition of his achievements.

=== Resettling Xiutu clans in Gaoping County ===
Liang Yuanbi (梁元碧), a Xiutu leader in Liang Province, led more than 2,000 clans to submit to Wei rule. Guo Huai wrote to the Wei government, requesting permission for the Xiutu clans to be resettled in Gaoping County (高平縣; present-day Guyuan, Ningxia), Anding Commandery (安定郡). He also established the office of the Commandant of Xichuan (西川都尉) to oversee their safety. For his efforts, Guo Huai was promoted to General of the Vanguard (前將軍), in addition to his appointment as the Inspector (刺史) of Yong Province.

=== Pulling back from a campaign against Shu ===
In 244, Guo Huai served as the vanguard commander when Xiahou Xuan led Wei forces to attack Shu. During the campaign, Guo Huai sensed that the Wei army was at a disadvantage so he pulled back his troops, and therefore was not greatly defeated. He was conferred imperial authority by the Wei government after returning from the campaign.

=== Second Shu invasion ===
In 247, the Qiang tribes, led by Ehe (餓何), Shaoge (燒戈), (Note: In the 14th-century historical novel Romance of the Three Kingdoms (Sanguo Yanyi), Ehe and Shaoge are amalgamated into a single character, Ehe Shaoge, who has a minor role in Chapter 109.) Fatong (伐同), Ezhesai (蛾遮塞) and others, started a rebellion against Wei in four commanderies: Longxi, Nan'an (南安; around present-day Wushan County, Gansu), Jincheng (金城; around present-day Lanzhou, Gansu) and Xiping (西平; around present-day Xining, Qinghai). They attacked several cities and towns in the area, and called for Shu forces to support them.

The Wei government ordered Xiahou Ba to lead troops to garrison at the flank. When Guo Huai and his forces showed up at Didao (狄道; around present-day Lintao County, Gansu), his advisers suggested that they should attack Fuhan County (枹罕縣; in present-day Linxia County, Gansu) and pacify the Qiang tribes first before dealing with the Shu invaders. Guo Huai predicted that Jiang Wei would attack Xiahou Ba's position, so he headed south to reinforce Xiahou Ba. As he expected, Jiang Wei did attack Xiahou Ba at the west of the Tao River, but retreated when Guo Huai and his reinforcements showed up. Guo Huai then moved on to attack the Qiang rebels, killed Ehe and Shaoge, and forced the thousands of Qiang clans to surrender.

=== Third Shu invasion ===
In 248, Qiang rebels led by Ezhesai (蛾遮塞) occupied fortresses in Heguan (河關; in the vicinity of present-day Dingxi, Gansu) and Baitu (白土; in present-day Minhe County, Qinghai) counties and used them as defences against Wei forces across the Tao River. Guo Huai pretended that he was going to attack from upstream, but actually secretly ordered his troops to cross the river downstream to attack Baitu. The assault was successful and the rebels were defeated. Zhiwudai (治無戴) led his tribal forces to attack Wuwei Commandery but left his family in Xihai Commandery (西海郡; near the Juyan Lake Basin, Inner Mongolia). When Guo Huai learnt about it, he led his troops to attack Xihai Commandery, but encountered Zhiwudai and his forces, who were on their way back from Wuwei Commandery. The two armies clashed at the north of Longyi County (龍夷縣), with the Wei forces emerging victorious and Zhiwudai's forces retreating.

Jiang Wei led Shu forces from Shiying (石營; northwest of present-day Xihe County, Gansu) to Qiangchuan (彊川) to rendezvous with Zhiwudai and his retreating forces. He left Liao Hua behind in Chengzhong Mountain (成重山) to build a fortress and gather the remaining Qiang forces and keep them as hostages in the fortress. When Guo Huai heard about Jiang Wei's advances, he wanted to divide his forces into two groups to attack the enemy. His officers, however, had a different opinion. They expected to Jiang Wei to head west to meet Zhiwudai and combine their forces, while Liao Hua would remain behind to defend the Shu position at Chengzhong Mountain. If they split their army into two, their attacking power would be greatly reduced, and they might end up in a situation where they were able to neither resist Jiang Wei nor capture Liao Hua's position. They urged Guo Huai to concentrate on advancing westward to attack Jiang Wei and Zhiwudai separately before they could meet up.

Guo Huai stood by his initial plan and said, "If we go to capture Liao Hua now, we will catch the enemy off guard, and Jiang Wei will surely look back in panic. By the time Jiang Wei arrives on his own, we can secure Liao Hua and exhaust Jiang Wei's resources. Our troops will not have to travel far west, and the Hu tribes will naturally separate. This is a strategy that achieves two goals at once." He then instructed Xiahou Ba to lead one detachment to pursue Jiang Wei towards Tazhong (沓中; northwest of present-day Zhugqu County, Gansu), while he led the other group to attack Liao Hua. As Guo Huai foresaw, Jiang Wei did turn back to save Liao Hua and failed to meet up with Zhiwudai. As a reward for his contributions, the Wei government promoted Guo Huai from a village marquis to a Marquis of a Chief District (都鄉侯).

=== Fourth Shu invasion ===
In 249, Guo Huai was promoted to General Who Attacks the West (征西將軍) and put in charge of supervising military operations in Yong and Liang provinces.

In the autumn of 249, Jiang Wei led Shu forces on a fourth invasion of Wei and built two fortresses at Qushan (麴山; southeast of present-day Min County, Gansu), which were respectively guarded by the Shu officers Ju An (句安) and Li Xin (李歆). He also contacted the Qiang tribes and requested assistance from them in harassing the Wei-controlled commanderies in Yong Province. After discussing with Chen Tai, the Inspector of Yong Province, Guo Huai ordered him, Xu Zhi and Deng Ai to lead Wei forces to attack the Shu fortresses at Qushan and cut off their food and water supplies. Ju An and Li Xin led their men to taunt Deng Ai to attack them, but Deng Ai ignored them. As time passed, the two fortresses gradually ran out of supplies. Jiang Wei led his troops from Mount Niutou (牛頭山; west of present-day Zhaohua District, Guangyuan, Sichuan) to reinforce the fortresses. They encountered Chen Tai and his army along the way. Chen Tai ordered his army to build forts to resist Jiang Wei and his troops but refrain from engaging the enemy. At the same time, he also wrote to Guo Huai and requested his help in attacking Mount Niutou. Guo Huai did so and led his forces across the Tao River in preparation for attacking Mount Niutou.

After Jiang Wei retreated, Ju An and Li Xin became isolated at the Shu fortresses at Qushan, so they had no choice but to surrender to the Wei forces. Guo Huai then led his troops further west to attack the restless Qiang tribes and forced them to surrender.

== Later life and death ==
In 250, Cao Fang, the Wei emperor, issued an imperial edict praising Guo Huai for his contributions and achievements during his over 30-year tenure in the Guanzhong region. He also conferred upon Guo Huai the title of General of Chariots and Cavalry (車騎將軍), granted him full and unconditional imperial authority, and ordered that he be accorded treatment equivalent to the treatment accorded to the Three Ducal Ministers. Guo Huai remained in charge of planning and overseeing all military operations in Yong and Liang provinces.

Guo Huai was also promoted from a district marquis to a county marquis under the title "Marquis of Yangqu" (陽曲侯), with a marquisate comprising 2,780 taxable households. The Wei government then took out 300 households from his marquisate, created a new marquisate, and awarded it to one of his sons under a village marquis title. Guo Huai died on 23 February 255 during Cao Mao's reign. He was posthumously appointed as General-in-Chief (大將軍) and granted the posthumous title "Marquis Zhen" (貞侯).

== Family and relatives ==
Guo Huai married a younger sister of the Wei general Wang Ling. In 251, Wang Ling started a rebellion in Shouchun (壽春; around present-day Shou County, Anhui) against Wei but failed and ended up being captured. He committed suicide while being escorted as a prisoner to Luoyang. The Wei imperial court ordered the arrest and execution of his family members. When the imperial censors came to arrest Guo Huai's wife (because she was Wang Ling's sister), Guo Huai's subordinates and thousands of Qiang, Di and Xiongnu tribal leaders came to ask Guo Huai to beg the imperial court to spare his wife, but he reluctantly refused. As his wife was being taken away, many people who lined the path to see her off shed tears, tried to grab her hands, and even wanted to attack the guards to save her. Guo Huai's five sons came to see their father and kowtowed until their foreheads bled while begging their father to save their mother. Guo Huai, moved by his sons' filial piety, changed his mind and ordered his subordinates to bring his wife back. Thousands of Guo Huai's men pursued the imperial censors on horseback, caught up with them, and brought back Guo Huai's wife within a few days. Guo Huai then wrote a letter to the Wei regent Sima Yi: "My five sons grieve for their mother and are willing to sacrifice themselves for her. Without their mother, my five sons would perish, and without my five sons, I would cease to exist. Now I have brought her back with all haste, but if this is not in accordance with the law you ordered, I am willing to face the Emperor himself and accept my responsibility for these transgressions." Sima Yi was extremely impressed with Guo Huai's letter and issued an exception for his wife, pardoning her.

One of Guo Huai's sons, Guo Tong (郭統), inherited his father's peerage and became the next Marquis of Yangqu (陽曲侯). He also served under the Wei government and the highest appointment he held was Inspector (刺史) of Jing Province (covering present-day Hubei and Hunan). After Guo Tong's death, his son Guo Zheng (郭正) succeeded him as the next Marquis of Yangqu. Sometime between 264 and 265, the Wei government established a new five-rank nobility system and converted Guo Huai's peerage from the Marquis of Yangqu to the Viscount of Fenyang (汾陽子).

=== Guo Huai's younger brothers and their families ===
==== Guo Pei ====
Guo Pei (郭配), whose courtesy name was Zhongnan (仲南), served as the Administrator (太守) of Chengyang Commandery (城陽郡; around present-day southeastern Shandong). Guo Pei had at least two daughters: one of them married Pei Xiu; the other, named Guo Huai (郭槐), married Jia Chong. Guo Pei also had two sons: Guo Zhan (郭展), whose courtesy name was Taishu (泰舒); and Guo Yu (郭豫), whose courtesy name was Taining (泰寧). Guo Zhan performed well in office and rose to the position of Minister Coachman (太僕); Guo Yu served as a military adviser (參軍) to the Chancellor of State (相國), but died early. Guo Yu's daughter married Wang Yan (王衍; 256–311), a notable scholar of the early Western Jin dynasty.

==== Guo Zhen ====
Guo Zhen (郭鎮), whose courtesy name was Jinan (季南), served as a Supervisor of the Internuncios (謁者僕射). Guo Zhen's son, Guo Yi (郭弈; died 287), had the courtesy name Taiye (泰業) and served as the Inspector of Yong Province (雍州刺史) and a Master of Writing (尚書) during the Western Jin dynasty. Shan Tao, one of the Seven Sages of the Bamboo Grove, once praised Guo Yi for being virtuous and magnanimous. A daughter of Guo Zhen was the mother of Liu Kun and his elder brother Liu Yu. (Note: Liu Yu's biography in Book of Jin recorded that both he and Liu Kun were maternal nephews of Guo Yi.)

==== Guo Liang ====
Guo Liang (郭亮) was a younger brother of Guo Huai. One of his descendants, Guo Zuo (郭祚; 449 – 29 August 515), served as an official under the Northern Wei dynasty.

== In popular culture ==
=== In Romance of the Three Kingdoms ===
Guo Huai is a minor character in the 14th-century historical novel Romance of the Three Kingdoms, which romanticises the historical figures and events before and during the Three Kingdoms period of China. In the novel, he dies in 253 after being fatally wounded by an arrow fired by Jiang Wei during the sixth of Jiang Wei's Northern Expeditions.

=== Modern era depiction ===
Guo Huai is a playable character in the seventh and eighth instalments of Koei's Dynasty Warriors video game series.

== See also ==
- Lists of people of the Three Kingdoms
