= Guo Huai (wife of Jia Chong) =

Mother-in-law of Chinese Emperor Hui of Jin (237–296)

Guo Huai 郭槐
- Born: 237
- Died: 296; Luoyang
- Spouse: Jia Chong
- Children: Jia Quan (stepdaughter); Jia Jun (stepdaughter); Jia Nanfeng; Jia Wu; Jia Limin; Another son
- Father: Guo Pei

Guo Huai (Chinese: 郭槐; pinyin: Guō Huái; Wade–Giles: Kuo^{1} Huai^{2}, 237–296), courtesy name Yuhuang (玉璜) or Yuanshao (媛韶, according to her entombed stele), was a niece of the general Guo Boji, the second wife of Jia Chong, the mother of Jia Nanfeng, and the mother-in-law of Emperor Hui of Jin; a niece was the wife of Wang Yan. During her life, she also went by Lady of Guangcheng (廣城君) and Lady of Yicheng (宜城君). After her death, she received the posthumous name Xuan (宣).

Her life was marked by severe cruelty, jealousy, and dishonesty, although these accounts may have been colored by the bias of Book of Jin historians.

== Biography ==
=== Marriage troubles ===
Guo Huai's father Guo Pei (郭配) was the governor of Chengyang Commandery and a younger brother of the Cao Wei general Guo Boji. She became Jia Chong's second wife in 257 after his first wife, Li Wan (李婉), was banished to the Korean border as a result of her father Li Feng's downfall and execution in 254. Jia Chong already had two daughters with Li Wan, including Jia Quan (賈荃).

In 266, after he overthrew Cao Wei and established the Jin dynasty (266–420), Sima Yan (Emperor Wu of Jin) decreed a general amnesty. Li Wan was allowed to return to the national capital Luoyang. Jia Chong's mother and his adult daughters (Jia Quan was by then a princess married to Sima You) all wanted him to divorce Guo Huai and welcome Li Wan back, but Guo Huai allegedly threw a fit and claimed to have a part in his contributions to the dynasty. Eventually the emperor intervened and personally permitted Jia Chong to have a left-hand wife and a right-hand wife. (Jia Chong had been a loyal supporter of Sima Yan in his rise to power.) However, Jia Chong declined (because he feared Guo Huai's tantrums, so historians claim) and only built a villa for Li Wan outside of Luoyang and had no communication with her.

Another account related how Guo Huai decided to pay Li Wan a visit in spite of Jia Chong's opposition. Dressed in her full regalia and taking a large retinue of attendants and slaves, she went outside of the city and strutted into Li Wan's residence. However, when Li Wan rose to greet her, Guo Huai was so awed by her charisma that she supposedly found her knees giving way and she knelt. When she returned, Jia Chong said something to the effect of "Told you!". After that, whenever Jia Chong went out, she sent someone to follow him to make sure he did not visit Li Wan.

=== Killing of wet nurses ===
Guo Huai bore Jia Chong two daughters, Jia Nanfeng and Jia Wu (賈午), as well as two sons, supposedly victims of her own doing. Whether the following account is real or not cannot be ascertained.

One day, when her first son Jia Limin (賈黎民) was still a toddler, Jia Chong returned home and caressed his son, who was being carried by his wet nurse. Guo Huai saw this and misinterpreted it as her husband having an affair with the wet nurse, so she whipped the wet nurse, killing her. Jia Limin was so distressed by his wet nurse's death that he fell sick and died. Guo Huai bore Jia Chong another (unnamed) son later, but the entire tragedy repeated itself when Guo Huai suspected her son's wet nurse of having an affair with her husband. Jia Chong had no son left to succeed him when he died in 282, and eventually Guo Huai changed the name of their grandson Han Mi (Jia Wu's son) to Jia Mi.

=== Marrying off daughter by bribing ===
In 271, Jia Chong desperately wanted to avoid a military assignment, so he decided to have one of his daughters to marry the developmentally disabled crown prince, Sima Zhong. The emperor initially rejected the idea, as he preferred Wei Guan's daughter, who was mild-tempered, beautiful, tall, and fair-skinned, as opposed to the Jia sisters, who were not only jealous like their mother, but also ugly, short, and dark-skinned. However, because Guo Huai was on friendly terms with Empress Yang Yan, she bribed the empress and her associates so that all greatly praised the Jia sisters. Eventually, Emperor Wu agreed, and Jia Nanfeng became Sima Zhong's wife in 272. When Sima Zhong became the emperor in 290, he made Jia Nanfeng the empress, and Guo Huai became the Lady of Guangcheng and enjoyed great power. It was said that whenever Guo Huai passed by, the minister Shi Chong would stop and prostrate himself before her.

=== Final years ===
As years went by, Empress Jia was increasingly taking advantage of her husband's mental disability and practically dominated the government. Worried, Guo Huai's nephew Pei Wei had convinced Guo Huai to advise her daughter to treat the crown prince Sima Yu well. Sima Yu's mother Xie Jiu (謝玖), an imperial concubine, was considered by many to be a good replacement for the uncontrollable empress. Also sensing the danger, Guo Huai wanted Empress Jia to adopt Sima Yu as her own son, and she further advocated for the marriage between him and Jia Wu's daughter, but that was opposed by both her daughters and did not take place.

After Guo Huai became terminally ill, her title changed to Lady of Yicheng which was suggested by a diviner. On her deathbed, she repeated her warning to Jia Nanfeng regarding Sima Yu. She was buried by the empress according to a ritual that far exceeded her position. The people were indignant but no one dared to speak out. (Eventually Jia Nanfeng had Sima Yu assassinated and in turn got herself killed, along with Jia Wu and Jia Mi, in a coup.)

== Entombed stele ==
Guo Huai's entombed stone stele was discovered in 1930 in Pingle, Henan, northeast of Luoyang. Unlike her depiction by historians, the commemorative text on her tomb stele gives a flattering account and praises her intelligence, reverence, and frugality, among many other virtues. She was also described as a "unifier of lineages and one concerned with ritual propriety".
