= Jia Nanfeng =

Chinese Jin dynasty empress consort (257–300)

Jia Nanfeng 賈南風

"Power behind the throne" of the Jin dynasty
- Reign: July 291 – May 300
- Predecessor: Sima Liang and Wei Guan
- Successor: Sima Lun

Empress consort of the Jin dynasty
- Reign: 16 May 290 – 7 May 300
- Predecessor: Empress Yang Zhi
- Successor: Empress Yang Xianrong
- Born: 257; Xiangfen County, Shanxi
- Died: 13 May 300 (aged 42–43); Luoyang, Henan
- Spouse: Emperor Hui of Jin
- Issue: Princess Hedong; Princess Shiping; Sima Xuanhua, Princess Hongnong; Sima Nǚyan, Lady Aixian
- Clan: Jia (賈)
- Father: Jia Chong
- Mother: Guo Huai

Jia Nanfeng (257 (Note: According to Jia Nanfeng's biography in Book of Jin, she was two years older than Sima Zhong. Since Sima Zhong was born in 259, her birth year should be 257. Vol. 79 of Zizhi Tongjian also recorded that Jia was two years older than Sima Zhong, but also indicated that she was 15 (by East Asian reckoning) when she became Crown Princess in April 272.) – 13 May 300), nicknamed Shi (峕), was a Chinese empress consort. She was a daughter of Jia Chong and the first wife of Emperor Hui of the Jin dynasty and also a granddaughter of Jia Kui. She is commonly seen as a villainous figure in Chinese history, as the person who provoked the War of the Eight Princes, leading to the Wu Hu rebellions and the Jin Dynasty's loss of northern and central China. Between July 291 to May 300, she ruled the Jin empire from behind the scenes by dominating her developmentally disabled husband.

== Early life and marriage ==
Jia Nanfeng was born in 257 to the Jin official Jia Chong and his second wife Guo Huai. She was their oldest daughter, although Jia Chong had two daughters from his previous marriage to noble lady Li Wan, a daughter of Li Feng. The couple had another daughter, Jia Wu (賈午), in 260. They also had two sons, both of whom died young. Jia Nanfeng also had a nursemaid, Xu Yi, who later served her as a trusted court maid.

In 271, Jia's father desperately wanted to avoid an assignment to guard the Guanzhong region and fend off attacks from Di and Qiang (氐羌) rebels, so he decided to have either Jia or her younger sister marry the developmentally disabled crown prince, Sima Zhong. The emperor initially rejected the idea, as he preferred Wei Guan's daughter as a bride for the crown prince. Indeed, Emperor Wu argued:

There are five reasons why Duke Wei's daughter is appropriate, and there are five reasons why Duke Jia's daughter is inappropriate. The Wei family are known for producing male children, and Lady Wei is mild-tempered, beautiful, tall, and fair-skinned. The Jia family lacks male children, and Lady Jia is jealous, ugly, short, and dark-skinned.

However, Guo Huai was on friendly terms with Empress Yang Yan, whose associates all greatly praised Jia's daughters. Eventually, Emperor Wu agreed, but selected Jia Wu to marry Crown Prince Zhong. When Wu was to wear formal dress to be examined, however, she was too young and too short for the dress, so Jia Nanfeng was chosen. They married on 2 April 272, (Note: According to Jia Nanfeng's biography in Book of Jin and vol.79 of Zizhi Tongjian, she was made Crown Prince Consort on the xinmao day of the 2nd month of the 8th year of the Taishi era of Sima Yan's reign. This corresponds to 2 Apr 272 in the Julian calendar. However, according to the epitaph of Jia Nanfeng's wet nurse Xu Yi, Jia was made crown prince consort in the 1st month of the 6th year of the Tai'shi era. The month corresponds to 8 Feb to 8 Mar 270 in the Julian calendar. In his Zizhi Tongjian Kaoyi, Sima Guang indicated that both Sanshi Guo Chun Qiu and Jin Chun Qiu recorded that Sima Zhong was wedded in the 2nd month of the 8th year of the Tai'shi era.) and she was created crown princess. She was 15, and he was 13. She became quickly known for her jealousy, but she established a relationship with the crown prince where he both loved and feared her. For the rest of her life, she would have him firmly in her control. When several of his concubines became pregnant, she killed them herself in fits of jealousy; Emperor Wu was going to depose her, and only intercession by his second wife Empress Yang Zhi (Empress Yang Yan's cousin, whom he married after her death) led to Crown Princess Jia being spared. When, on one occasion, Wei hinted to Emperor Wu that Crown Prince Zhong was so unintelligent as to be an inappropriate heir, it was Crown Princess Jia who thought of the solution to Emperor Wu's subsequent inquiries of Crown Prince Zhong—having someone else write simple but correct answers to the inquiries, so that Emperor Wu was impressed.

Crown Princess Jia bore her husband four daughters—the Princesses Hedong, Hongnong (named Xuanhua) and Shiping, as well as one daughter named Nǚyan (女彦) (Note: The names of two of Empress Jia's daughters is found in Yiwen Leiju. Sima Xuanhua, Princess Hongnong, was also mentioned in the Tang-era Jin Shu as the wife of Fu Xuan, son of Fu Zhi, son of Fu Gu.) who died early and was given the posthumous name Aixian. However, she would not bear him a son; his only son Sima Yu was borne by Consort Xie Jiu, who was initially a concubine of Emperor Wu but given to Crown Prince Zhong shortly before his marriage to Crown Princess Jia, so that she could teach him how to have sexual relations. As the years went on and Crown Princess Jia bore no sons, she became jealous of Consort Xie and Prince Yu, but took no decisive actions against them at this point, because Emperor Wu greatly favored Prince Yu.

When Emperor Wu died on 16 May 290, Crown Prince Zhong ascended the throne as Emperor Hui. Empress Yang Zhi was created empress dowager and Crown Princess Jia was created empress.

== As empress ==
=== Role in coups against Yang Jun and Sima Liang ===
Empress Dowager Yang's father Yang Jun initially served as Emperor Hui's regent. Knowing Empress Jia to be treacherous, he set up a system where edicts signed by Emperor Hui had to be co-signed by Empress Dowager Yang as well, to prevent Empress Jia from interfering. For a while, her influence was limited to matters inside the palace—and after her stepson Prince Yu was created crown prince, she often blocked Consort Xie from having access to her son.

Empress Jia was not happy about having little input in governance, however. She therefore conspired with the eunuch Dong Meng (董猛) and the generals Meng Guan (孟觀) and Li Zhao (李肇) against the Yangs. She tried to include Emperor Hui's granduncle Sima Liang, the most respected of the imperial princes, into the conspiracy, but Sima Liang declined; instead, she persuaded Emperor Hui's brother, Sima Wei the Prince of Chu, to join her plan. In 291, after Sima Wei returned to Luoyang from his defense post (Jing Province (荊州, modern Hubei and Hunan)) with his troops, a coup went into progress.

Empress Jia, who had her husband easily under her control, had him issue an edict declaring that Yang Jun had committed crimes and should be removed from his posts. It also ordered Sima Wei and Sima Yao (司馬繇) the Duke of Dong'an to attack Yang's forces and defend against counterattacks. Quickly, it became clear that Yang was in trouble. Empress Dowager Yang, trapped in the palace herself, wrote an edict ordering assistance for Yang Jun and put it on arrows, shooting it out of the palace. Empress Jia then made the bold declaration that Empress Dowager Yang was committing treason. Yang Jun was quickly defeated, and his clan was massacred in April. Empress Dowager Yang was deposed and imprisoned (and would die in 292 in imprisonment). Sima Liang was recalled to serve as regent, along with Wei Guan. After that time, Empress Jia became more free involved in the management of the empire.

Sima Liang and Wei tried to get the government on track, but Empress Jia continued to interfere with management of daily governmental matters. They also became concerned about the violent temper of Sima Wei and therefore tried to strip him of his military command, but Sima Wei persuaded Empress Jia to let him keep his military command. Sima Wei's assistants Qi Sheng (岐盛) and Gongsun Hong (公孫宏) thereafter falsely told Empress Jia that Sima Liang and Wei planned to depose the emperor. Empress Jia, who had already resented Wei for having, during Emperor Wu's reign, suggested that he change his heir, and therefore resolved to undergo a second coup.

In the summer of 291, Empress Jia had Emperor Hui personally write an edict to Sima Wei, ordering him to have Sima Liang and Wei removed from their offices. His forces thereby surrounded Sima Liang and Wei's mansions, and while both men's subordinates recommended resistance, each declined and was captured. Against what the edict said, both were killed—Sima Liang with his heir Sima Ju (司馬矩) and Wei with nine of his sons and grandsons. Qi then suggested to Sima Wei to take the chance to kill Empress Jia's relatives and take over the government, but Sima Wei hesitated—and at the same time, Empress Jia came to the realization that killing Sima Liang and Wei, if it had been realized that she intended it, could bring a political firestorm and that also Sima Wei would not be easily controlled. She therefore publicly declared that Sima Wei had falsely issued the edict. Sima Wei's troops abandoned him, and he was captured and executed. Sima Liang and Wei were posthumously honored. Through this, Empress Jia could finally take all the power herself, and rule with the emperor as her puppet. After this point on, Empress Jia became the undisputed power behind the throne for several years.

=== As paramount authority ===
Empress Jia was now in control over the Jin empire in close association with several advisors that she trusted—the capable official Zhang Hua, her cousins Pei Wei and Jia Mo (賈模), and her nephew Jia Mi (originally named Han Mi but posthumously adopted into the line of Jia Chong's son Jia Limin (賈黎民)). She also closely associated with her cousin-once-removed Guo Zhang, her sister Jia Wu (賈午), and Emperor Wu's concubine Zhao Can (趙粲). (Note: Zhao Can was also a cousin of Jia's mother-in-law Yang Yan, as Yang Yan's mother Lady Zhao was Zhao Can's aunt.) She lacked self-control, and was violent and capricious in her ways, but Zhang, Pei, and Jia Mo were honest men who generally kept the government in order. However, as she grew increasingly unbridled in her behavior (including committing adultery with many men and later murdering them to silence them), Zhang, Pei, and Jia Mo considered deposing her and replacing her with Crown Prince Yu's mother Consort Xie, but they hesitated and never took actual action. After Jia Mo died in 299, it became even harder to control her actions.

== Downfall and death ==
The relationship between Empress Jia and Crown Prince Yu had always been an uneasy one. Empress Jia's mother Guo Huai (郭槐) had constantly advised Empress Jia to treat Crown Prince Yu well, as her own son, and she advocated marrying Jia Mi's sister to Crown Prince Yu. However, Empress Jia and Jia Wu opposed this, and instead married a daughter of the official Wang Yan (王衍) to Crown Prince Yu. (Wang had two daughters, but Empress Jia had Crown Prince Yu marry the less beautiful one and had Jia Mi marry the more beautiful one.) After Lady Guo's death, the relationship between Empress Jia and Crown Prince Yu quickly deteriorated, as Jia Wu and Consort Zhao provoked difficulties between them. At one point, Empress Jia falsely claimed herself to be pregnant and planned to falsely claim her nephew Han Weizu (韓慰祖, Jia Wu's son with her husband Han Shou (韓壽)) to be her own, but for reasons unknown did not actually carry out that plan. Further, Crown Prince Yu and Jia Mi never liked each other, and Jia Mi, as a result, also advised Empress Jia to depose Crown Prince Yu.

In early 300, Empress Jia agreed and took action. When Crown Prince Yu was in the palace to make an official petition to have his ill son Sima Bin (司馬彬) created a prince, Empress Jia forced him to drink a large amount of wine and, once he was drunk, had him write out a statement in which he declared intention to murder the emperor and the empress and to take over as emperor. Empress Jia presented the writing to the officials and initially wanted Crown Prince Yu executed—but after some resistance, she only had him deposed and reduced to status of a commoner on 6 February. Crown Prince Yu's mother Consort Xie was executed, as was his favorite concubine Consort Jiang Jun (蔣俊).

On 27 April 300, (Note: According to Sima Zhong's biography in Book of Jin, Sima Yu was killed on the guiwei day of the 3rd month of the 1st year of the Yongkang era of his reign. This corresponds to 27 Apr 300 on the Julian calendar.) under the advice of a prince she favored -Sima Lun the Prince of Zhao, Emperor Wu's uncle (Note: Sima Lun was Sima Zhao's half-brother and granduncle to Emperor Hui.) — Empress Jia decided to eliminate Crown Prince Yu as a threat. She sent assassins and had Crown Prince Yu assassinated. Sima Lun, however, had other plans—he wanted to have Empress Jia murder the crown prince so that he could use the murder as an excuse to overthrow her. He started a coup less than two weeks later, killing Jia Mi, Zhang, Pei, and other associates of Empress Jia. Empress Jia was deposed on the same day (7 May 300 (Note: According to Sima Zhong's biography in Book of Jin, Jia Nanfeng was deposed as empress and her associates were killed on the guisi day of the 4th month of the 1st year of the Yongkang era of his reign. This corresponds to 7 May 300 in the Julian calendar.)) and forced to commit suicide a few days later by drinking "jinxiaojiu" (金屑酒, "wine with gold fragments").

== Notes ==
Chinese royalty
Preceded by Empress Yang Zhi	Empress consort of Jin Dynasty (266–420); 290–300	Succeeded by Empress Yang Xianrong
