= Yang Yan (empress) =

Empress consort of the Jin dynasty (238-274)

Yang Yan 楊艷

Empress consort of the Jin dynasty
- Tenure: 20 March 266 – 25 August 274
- Successor: Empress Yang Zhi
- Born: 238
- Died: August 25, 274 (aged 35–36)
- Spouse: Emperor Wu of Jin
- Issue: Sima Gui (Note: According to the Book of Jin, Sima Yi, son of Sima Wei, was made heir to Sima Gui; Gui was given the posthumous name of "Diao" in 289. According to Emperor Wu's biography in the same work, Sima Yi was made Prince of Piling on the same day his father was made Prince of Chu; note the different characters used for "Yi". Emperor Hui's biography recorded that Sima Gui died on the jia'xu day of the 4th month of the 1st year of the Yuan'kang era; this record likely refers to Sima Yi's death instead. Also, there was no jia'xu day in the 5th month; the month corresponds to 14 Jun to 13 Jul 291 in the Julian calendar.); Sima Zhong; Sima Jian (262 - 23 October 291)
Posthumous name
- Empress Wuyuan (武元皇后)
- Father: Yang Wenzong
- Mother: Lady Zhao (sister of Zhao Jun and Zhao Yu)

Yang Yan (楊艷) (238 (Note: According to Lady Yang's biography in Book of Jin, she was 37 (by East Asian reckoning) when she died. Thus by calculation, her birth year should be 238.) – 25 August 274 (Note: According to Sima Yan's biography in Book of Jin, Lady Yang died on the bingyin day of the 7th month of the 10th year of the Taishi era of his reign. This corresponds to 25 Aug 274 in the Julian calendar.)), courtesy name Qiongzhi (瓊芝), formally Empress Wuyuan (武元皇后, "the martial and discerning empress") was an empress of the Western Jin dynasty. She was the first wife of Emperor Wu.

== Early life and marriage to Sima Yan ==
Yang Yan was a daughter of Yang Wenzong (楊文宗), a marquess during the Cao Wei era and his wife Lady Zhao; Yang Wenzong was also a descendant of the famed Eastern Han official Yang Zhen (杨震) from the Yang clan of Hongnong. Her mother died early, probably when she was still in infancy, and she was initially raised by her maternal uncle Zhao Jun (赵俊) (Note: Zhao's name was written as "浚" (with the same pronunciation) in Sima Lun's and Lu Yun's biographies in Book of Jin. Also, it is unknown if Zhao was the same person as the Master of Writing who hated Li Han for refusing to serve under him.) and aunt (who breastfed her). After she grew older, she was raised by her stepmother Lady Duan. By this time, her father, who is said to have also died early, was probably dead.

When she was young, she was described as intelligent, studious and beautiful. A fortune teller once foretold that she would have an extraordinary honour, and it was said that when the Cao Wei regent Sima Zhao heard this, he took her and married her to his eldest son Sima Yan. She had three sons and three daughters with her husband. After Sima Zhao's death in September 265, Sima Yan inherited his father's position and forced the Cao Wei emperor Cao Huan to abdicate in favour of him about five months later. This action ended the state of Cao Wei and Sima Yan established the Jin dynasty (as Emperor Wu). On 20 March 266, Yang Yan was made empress. After becoming empress, Lady Yang, in gratitude, arranged for Zhao Jun to be promoted; Zhao Jun's niece Zhao Can (赵粲; daughter of his elder brother Zhao Yu (赵虞)) was also made Sima Yan's concubine. (Note: Zhao Jun's son Zhao Xiang also served in the Jin government. When Zhao Jun was killed by Sima Lun, Zhao Xiang was spared. However, Zhao Xiang later joined Sima Ying and attacked Sima Lun. After Lu Yun was captured by Sima Ying, Lu Zhi used this precedent to persuade Sima Ying to execute Lu Yun.)

== As empress ==
Empress Yang's oldest son, Sima Gui (司馬軌), died aged two (by East Asian reckoning), making her second son, Sima Zhong the legitimate heir, by traditional succession laws. However, Emperor Wu hesitated about selecting him as crown prince because he was developmentally disabled. Empress Yang was instrumental in persuading him to have her son designated crown prince anyway, arguing that tradition should not be abandoned easily. She was also instrumental in her son's selection of a wife, as Emperor Wu initially favoured Wei Guan's daughter, but Empress Yang, friendly with Jia Chong's wife Lady Guo, praised Jia's daughter Jia Nanfeng greatly, leading to Jia Nanfeng's selection as crown princess.

In 273, when Emperor Wu was seeking beautiful women to serve as his concubines, he initially put Empress Yang in charge of the selection process. She preferred those women with slender bodies and fair skin, but did not favour those with beautiful faces. She also left off the list a beauty surnamed Bian (daughter of Bian Fan), whom Emperor Wu favoured, stating that since the Bians have served as empresses for three generations of Cao Wei rulers (Cao Cao's wife Princess Bian, Cao Mao's empress and Cao Huan's empress) that it would be too degrading for her to be a concubine. This decision displeased Emperor Wu, so he took over the selection process. Despite this and her husband's obsession with accumulating concubines, they appeared to have had a genuine and continuing affection for each other.

In 274, Empress Yang grew ill. She became concerned that whoever would be empress next; she was particularly concerned about Consort Hu Fang (胡芳; daughter of Hu Fen), (Note: Hu Fang had a biography in vol.31 of Book of Jin.) whom Emperor Wu greatly favoured, would not support her son. She therefore asked Emperor Wu to marry her cousin Yang Zhi. Emperor Wu, distressed over her illness, agreed. She died soon thereafter in August and was buried with honours due an empress in the tomb that her husband was eventually buried at when he died in May 290. Concubine Zuo Fen wrote a long song of mourning in her honour.

In December 276, based on his promise to his late wife, the emperor married Yang Zhi and created her empress.

== Sources ==
- Kang-i Sun Chang; Haun Saussy; Charles Yim-tze Kwong (1999). Women writers of traditional China: an anthology of poetry and criticism. Stanford University Press.

Chinese royalty
New dynasty	Empress of the Jin dynasty (266–420); 265–274	Succeeded by Yang Zhi
Preceded by Empress Bian of Cao Wei	Empress of China (Northern/Central/Southwestern); 265–274	Succeeded by Yang Zhi
