= Yang Zhi (empress) =

Yang Zhi 楊芷

Empress consort of the Jin dynasty
- Tenure: 13 December 276 – 16 May 290
- Predecessor: Empress Yang Yan
- Successor: Empress Jia Nanfeng

Empress dowager of the Jin dynasty
- Tenure: 16 May 290 – 24 April 291
- Predecessor: Wang Yuanji
- Successor: Yu Wenjun
- Born: 259
- Died: 6 March 292 (aged 32-33)
- Spouse: Emperor Wu of Jin
- Issue: Sima Hui
Posthumous name
- Empress Wudao (武悼皇后)
- Father: Yang Jun

Yang Zhi (楊芷) (259 – 6 March 292), courtesy name Jilan (季蘭), nickname Nanyin (男胤), formally Empress Wudao (武悼皇后, literally "the martial and fearful empress") was an empress of the Jin dynasty. She was Emperor Wu's second wife and cousin to his first wife, Empress Yang Yan.

== As empress consort ==
Not much is known about Yang Zhi's life before she married Emperor Wu. Before Empress Yang Yan died in August 274, she was fearful that whoever became empress next would undermine her developmentally disabled son Crown Prince Zhong's position as crown prince, and therefore she asked Emperor Wu to marry her cousin Yang Zhi after her death. Emperor Wu agreed and, in December 276, married Yang Zhi and created her empress. Her father Yang Jun became a key official in the administration and became extremely arrogant.

The new Empress Yang herself was described as beautiful and virtuous and favored by her husband. After Emperor Wu conquered Eastern Wu in May 280, he became largely obsessed with feasting and women, and tired of handling important matters of state. Empress Yang's father Yang Jun and her uncles Yang Yao (楊珧) and Yang Ji (楊濟) became those who made actual decisions and became very powerful. Empress Yang had a son, Sima Hui (司馬恢), in 283, but Prince Hui died on 14 August 284. She did not bear Emperor Wu other children afterwards.

Empress Yang was instrumental in keeping Crown Prince Zhong's wife Crown Princess Jia Nanfeng from being deposed, as Princess Jia was jealous and violent. After several of the crown prince's concubines became pregnant, Princess Jia personally had them killed. When Emperor Wu heard about this, he was angry and wanted to depose the crown princess, but Empress Yang persuaded him to remember the crown princess' father Jia Chong's contribution to the establishment of Jin. She also rebuked the crown princess to try to rein in her behavior—but the crown princess, not knowing that the empress had persuaded the emperor not to depose her, bore a grudge against the empress as a result.

In 289, Emperor Wu grew ill, and considered whom to make regent for Crown Prince Zhong. He considered both Yang Jun and his uncle Sima Liang the Prince of Ru'nan, the most respected of the imperial princes. As a result, Yang Jun became fearful of Sima Liang and had him posted to the key city of Xuchang (許昌, in modern Xuchang, Henan). Several other imperial princes were also posted to other key cities in the empire. By 290, Emperor Wu resolved to let Yang and Sima Liang both be regents, but after he wrote his will, the will was seized by Yang Jun, who instead had another will promulgated in which Yang alone was named regent. He died soon after in May. Crown Prince Zhong ascended the throne as Emperor Hui; Empress Yang was honored as empress dowager, and Yang Jun became regent.

== As empress dowager ==
Yang Jun quickly showed himself to be autocratic and incompetent, drawing the ire of many other nobles and officials. He tried to appease them by bestowing many titles and honors among them, but this only brought further contempt for his actions. He knew Emperor Hui's empress Jia Nanfeng to be strong-willed and treacherous, so he tried to put people loyal to him in charge of all the defense forces of the capital Luoyang, and also ordered that all edicts not only be signed by the emperor but also by Empress Dowager Yang before they could be promulgated.

Empress Jia, however, wanted to be involved in the government, and was angry that she was constantly rebuffed by Empress Dowager Yang and Yang Jun. She therefore conspired with the eunuch Dong Meng (董猛) and the generals Meng Guan (孟觀) and Li Zhao (李肇) against the Yangs. She tried to include Sima Liang in the conspiracy, but Sima Liang declined; instead, she persuaded her brother-in-law, Sima Wei the Prince of Chu, to join her plan. In 291, after Sima Wei returned to Luoyang from his defense post (Jing Province (荊州, modern Hubei and Hunan)) with his troops, a coup went into progress in April.

Empress Jia, who had her husband easily under her control, had him issue an edict declaring that Yang Jun had committed crimes and should be removed from his posts. It also ordered Sima Wei and Sima Yao (司馬繇) the Duke of Dong'an to attack Yang's forces and defend against counterattacks. Quickly, it became clear that Yang was in trouble. Empress Dowager Yang, trapped in the palace herself, wrote an edict ordering assistance for Yang Jun and put it on arrows, shooting it out of the palace. Empress Jia then made the bold declaration that Empress Dowager Yang was committing treason. Yang Jun was quickly defeated, and his clan was massacred. Only his wife Lady Pang, the empress dowager's mother, was pardoned and allowed to live with the empress dowager. However, Empress Jia continued to be resentful, and soon had Empress Dowager Yang deposed from her position and made a commoner, and then had Lady Pang executed, despite humble pleas from the empress dowager, who was put under house arrest inside the palace. Initially, her closest servants were allowed to remain to serve her, but in February 292, Empress Jia had them moved elsewhere. In despair, Empress Dowager Yang refused to eat and died after eight days of not eating.

Empress Dowager Yang was buried in a way most unfitting for an empress. The superstitious Empress Jia thought she might make accusations to the spirit of Emperor Wu after her death, so had her buried face down and also with various amulets and magical herbs that were intended to suppress her spirit. It was not until 5 May 307, long after Empress Jia's own defeat and death, that she was restored to her empress title and reburied with imperial honors. She was given a temple in which to be worshipped but was not worshipped in her husband Emperor Wu's temple. Yang Zhi would be the last empress dowager of the Western Jin; the next empress dowager of the Jin dynasty was Yu Wenjun, who was given the title about 33 years after Yang's death.

In c.May 342, during the reign of Emperor Cheng, her cult was merged into the temple of Emperor Wu.

Chinese royalty
Preceded by Yang Yan	Empress of Jin Dynasty (266–420); 276–290	Succeeded by Empress Jia Nanfeng
Preceded by Yang Yan	Empress of China (Northern/Central/Southwestern); 276–290	Succeeded by Empress Jia Nanfeng
Preceded by Empress Teng of Eastern Wu	Empress of China (Southeastern); 280–290	Succeeded by Empress Jia Nanfeng
