= Yang Jun (minister) =

Regent of Emperor Hui of Jin (died 291)

- 楊駿

Regent of the Jin dynasty
- In office May 290 – April 291
- Monarch: Emperor Hui

Personal details
- Born: Unknown (Note: Although Yang Jun's birth year was not recorded, his daughter Yang Zhi was born in 259. Thus, Yang Jun should be born in or before 246.)
- Died: 23 April 291
- Children: Yang Zhi

Yang Jun (楊駿) (died 23 April 291 (Note: According to Sima Zhong's biography in Book of Jin, Yang Jun died on the xinmao day of the 3rd month of the 1st year of the Yongping era of his reign. This corresponds to 23 Apr 291 on the Julian calendar.)), courtesy name Wenzhang (文長), was a Western Jin official during the reign of Emperor Wu and regent for Emperor Hui, Emperor Wu's son and successor.

== Life ==
Yang Jun was from Huayin in Hongnong Commandery (弘農, roughly modern Sanmenxia, Henan). He had a sister who was the mother of Zhang Shao (張邵 (Note: In vol.82 of Zizhi Tongjian, Zhang's name is written as "劭", with the same pronunciation.)), a grandson of Zhang Cheng. (Note: Zhang Shao, as Military Protector of the Palace, was later killed together with Yang Jun in Apr 291.) Yang's niece Yang Yan was Emperor Wu's first wife and empress. As she neared death in 274, she feared that whoever would be empress next would endanger the crown prince status of her developmentally disabled son, Sima Zhong. She therefore asked Emperor Wu to marry her cousin, Yang Jun's daughter Yang Zhi. Emperor Wu agreed, and after her death later during the year, he married Yang Zhi in 276 and created her empress. Yang Jun, as the empress' father, became an increasingly important official in government, and became exceedingly arrogant. In Emperor Wu's later years, when he became obsessed with feasting and women, Yang Jun and his brothers Yang Yao (楊珧) and Yang Ji (楊濟) became effectively in power.

As Emperor Wu grew ill in 289, he considered whom to make regent. He considered both Yang Jun and his uncle Sima Liang the Prince of Ru'nan, the most respected of the imperial princes. As a result, Yang Jun became fearful of Sima Liang and had him posted to the key city of Xuchang. Several other imperial princes were also posted to other key cities in the empire. By 290, Emperor Wu resolved to let Yang and Sima Liang both be regents, but after he wrote his will, the will was seized by Yang Jun, who instead had another will promulgated in which Yang alone was named regent. Emperor Wu died soon thereafter in May. Crown Prince Zhong succeeded to the throne as Emperor Hui.

Yang Jun became Emperor Hui's regent, and became much criticized for spending his energy on making himself secure—including not attending Emperor Wu's burial. Fearful of Emperor Hui's ambitious wife Empress Jia Nanfeng, he ordered that imperial edicts be co-signed by his daughter, Empress Dowager Yang. Yang knew that he had made a lot of enemies, and tried to pacify them by giving widespread promotions, but those promotions only served to show his weakness. His associates, including his brother Yang Ji, tried to persuade him to alleviate the tension by inviting Sima Liang back to the capital Luoyang to serve as coregent, a move that Yang Jun repeatedly rebuffed.

Empress Jia, who wanted her hand in governance, was dissatisfied with the situation, and conspired with the eunuch Dong Meng (董猛) and the generals Meng Guan (孟觀) and Li Zhao (李肇) against the Yangs. She tried to include Sima Liang in the conspiracy, but Sima Liang declined; instead, she persuaded Emperor Hui's half-brother, Sima Wei the Prince of Chu, to join her plan. In 291, after Sima Wei returned to Luoyang from his defense post (Note: Jing Province (荊州, modern Hubei and Hunan)) with his troops, a coup went into progress.

Empress Jia, who had her husband easily under her control, had him issue an edict declaring that Yang Jun had committed crimes and should be removed from his posts. It also ordered Sima Wei and Sima Yao (司馬繇), the Duke of Dong'an and son of Sima Zhou, to attack Yang's forces and defend against counterattacks. Quickly, it became clear that Yang was in trouble, particularly after he declined his strategists' suggestion to burn the palace gate to temporarily halt the advance of the imperial guards. Empress Dowager Yang, trapped in the palace herself, wrote an edict ordering assistance for Yang Jun and put it on arrows, shooting it out of the palace. Empress Jia then made the bold declaration that Empress Dowager Yang was committing treason. Yang Jun was quickly defeated, and his clan was massacred. (Note: Yang Jun had a paternal aunt who was the mother of Kuai Qin (蒯钦). On numerous occasions, Kuai Qin spoke bluntly to Yang Jun, earning the ire of Yang Yao and Yang Ji. While others feared for Kuai, he explained, "Yang Wenzhang may be dull, but he still knows that innocent parties cannot be killed indiscriminately. As he shuns me, I can then be spared from dying together with him. Otherwise, my clan's doom is not far away!")
