= Sima Yu =

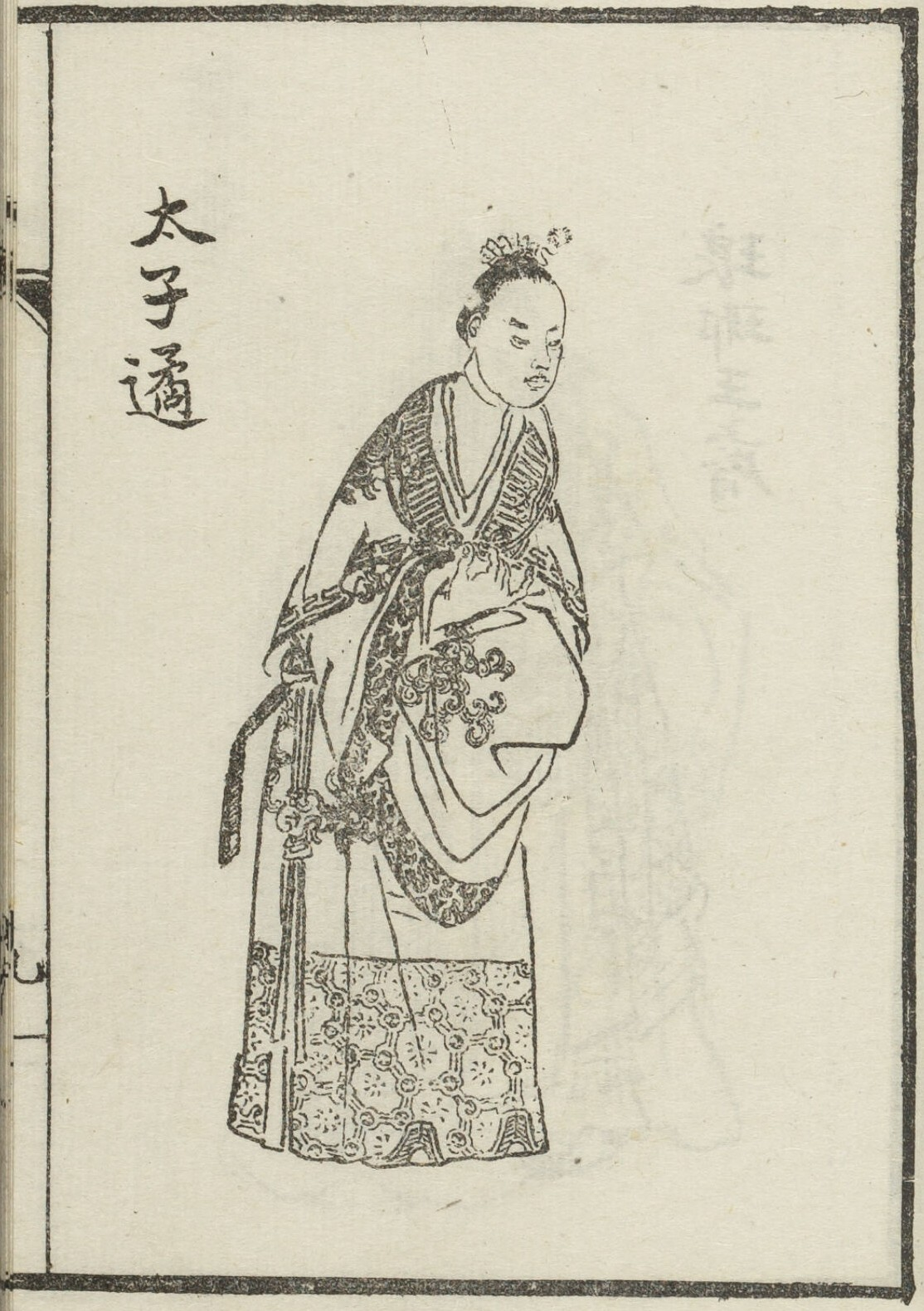

Crown Prince of the Jin dynasty
- Tenure: 16 October 290 – 6 February 300
- Successor: Sima Zang
- Born: 278
- Died: 300 (aged 21–22)
- Spouse: Wang Huifeng; Jiang Jun
- Issue: Sima Bin, Prince of Nanyang; Sima Zang, Prince Ai of Muyang; Sima Shang, Crown Prince Huaichong
Names
- Family name: Sima (司馬); Given name: Yu (遹); Courtesy name: Xizu (熙祖)
Posthumous name
- Crown Prince Minhuai (愍懷太子)
- Father: Emperor Hui of Jin
- Mother: Xie Jiu

Sima Yu (Chinese: 司馬遹; 278 (Note: According to Sima Yu's biography in Book of Jin, he was 23 (by East Asian reckoning) when he died. Thus by calculation, his birth year should be 278.) – 27 April 300 (Note: According to Sima Zhong's biography in Book of Jin, Sima Yu was killed on the guiwei day of the 3rd month of the 1st year of the Yongkang era of his reign. This corresponds to 27 Apr 300 on the Julian calendar. Vol.83 of Zizhi Tongjian also dated his death to this date.)), courtesy name Xizu (熙祖), posthumous name Crown Prince Minhuai (愍懷太子), was a crown prince of the Chinese Western Jin dynasty.

Sima Yu's father Sima Zhong was developmentally disabled, and before he, then crown prince, was to marry his wife Jia Nanfeng, Zhong's father Emperor Wu gave him one of his own concubines, Consort Xie Jiu (謝玖), so that Consort Xie could teach him how to have sexual relations. While Crown Princess Jia bore the crown prince four daughters, Sima Yu was his only son.

When Sima Yu was four years old, there was a fire in the palace, and Emperor Wu walked up a tower to observe it. Sima Yu pulled him aside and said, "At night, when something unusual like this happens, we should take precautions. The light of the fire should not shine on the emperor." Emperor Wu was surprised by this perceptive observation by a child, and praised the young prince as very much like his own grandfather Sima Yi. This was part of the reason why Emperor Wu let Crown Prince Zhong remain his heir. On 22 December 289, he created Prince Yu the Prince of Guangling. After Emperor Wu died in May 290, Crown Prince Zhong ascended the throne as Emperor Hui, and Prince Yu was created crown prince at the age of 12 on 16 October.

As Crown Prince Yu grew in age, however, he lost some of the good reputation that he had as a child, as he disliked studying and spent much time on building projects and games. Empress Jia, who had constantly been jealous of Crown Prince Yu and Consort Xie, did not discourage this behavior, but in fact encouraged it to further damage Crown Prince Yu's reputation. When Crown Prince Yu's staff would try to correct his ways, he would not listen to them. He also would not listen to them with regard to their advice to maintain strong relations with Empress Jia's family members. Empress Jia's mother Guo Huai had constantly advised Empress Jia to treat Crown Prince Yu well, as her own son, and she advocated marrying a daughter of Empress Jia's sister Jia Wu (賈午) to Crown Prince Yu. However, Empress Jia and Jia Wu opposed this, and instead married a daughter of the official Wang Yan to Crown Prince Yu. (Note: Wang had two daughters, but Empress Jia had Crown Prince Yu marry the less beautiful one and had her nephew Jia Mi marry the more beautiful one.) After Lady Guo's death, the relationship between Empress Jia and Crown Prince Yu quickly deteriorated, as Jia Wu and another associate of Empress Jia, Emperor Wu's concubine Consort Zhao Can (趙粲), provoked difficulties between them. Further, Crown Prince Yu and Jia Mi never liked each other, and Jia Mi, as a result, also advised Empress Jia to depose Crown Prince Yu.

In early 300, Empress Jia agreed and took action. When Crown Prince Yu was in the palace to make an official petition to have his ill son Sima Bin (司馬彬) created a prince, Empress Jia forced him to drink a large amount of wine and, once he was drunk, had him write out a statement in which he declared intention to murder the emperor and the empress and to take over as emperor. Empress Jia presented the writing to the officials and initially wanted Crown Prince Yu executed—but after some resistance, she only had him deposed and reduced to status of a commoner on 6 February. On the same day, (Note: According to Sima Zhong's biography in Book of Jin, Sima Yu was deposed as Crown Prince and Lady Xie was killed on the renxu day of the 12th month of the 9th year of the Yuan'kang (erroneously recorded as "Yong'ping") era of his reign. This corresponds to 6 Feb 300 on the Julian calendar. Volume 83 of Zizhi Tongjian also dated the event to that same day.) Crown Prince Yu's mother Consort Xie was executed; his favorite concubine Consort Jiang Jun (蔣俊, Sima Bin's mother) was also executed. Wang Yan divorced his daughter from the crown prince, who wrote an extant, lengthy letter to her explaining the incident through which Empress Jia framed him.

In April 300, under the advice of a prince she favored -- Sima Lun the Prince of Zhao, Emperor Wu's uncle—Empress Jia decided to eliminate Crown Prince Yu as a threat. She sent assassins and had Crown Prince Yu assassinated on 27 April. He was buried with honors due a prince—under his pre-crown-prince title of Prince of Guangling. Sima Lun's intent was, however, to use this assassination as an excuse to overthrow Empress Jia, and he did so less than two weeks later, on 7 May. He had Crown Prince Yu reburied with the honors due a crown prince on 15 July 300 and Yu was given the posthumous name "Minhuai". He also welcomed Crown Princess Wang back to the palace, along with Crown Prince Yu's surviving sons Sima Zang (司馬臧) (whom he had created crown prince on 12 June) and Sima Shang (司馬尚). However, when Sima Lun then usurped the throne briefly in 301, Crown Prince Zang was killed on 11 February. After Emperor Hui's restoration later that year, Sima Shang was created crown prince in c.July, but died on 7 May 302, extinguishing Crown Prince Yu's line.

== Family ==
Consort and issue(s):

- Consort Zhending, of the Wang clan of Langya (贞定妃 琅玡王氏; d. July 311 (Note: Lady Wang was a daughter of Wang Yan. She was killed during the Disaster of Yongjia in July 311.)), personal name Huifeng (惠風)
- Concubine, of the Jiang clan (妾蒋氏), personal name Jun (俊)
  - Sima Bin, Prince of Nanyang (司馬虨 南陽王, d. 20 February 300), first son
  - Sima Zang, Prince Ai of Puyang (司馬臧 晋濮陽哀王, 297 – 11 February 301), second son
  - Sima Shang, Crown Prince Huaichong (司馬尚 懷沖太孫, 300 – 7 May 302), third son
- Beauty, of the Feng clan (封美人)
