= Jia Chong =

Cao Wei and Jin dynasty official (217–282)

- 賈充

Supervisor of the Masters of Writing (錄尚書事)
- In office ?–?
- Monarch: Emperor Wu of Jin

Grand Commandant (太尉)
- In office 16 September 276 – 19 May 282
- Monarch: Emperor Wu of Jin

General of Chariots and Cavalry (車騎將軍)
- In office 9 February 266 – c.August 272
- Monarch: Emperor Wu of Jin

Prefect of the Masters of Writing (尚書令)
- In office ?–?
- Monarch: Emperor Wu of Jin

Minister of Works (司空)
- In office c.August 272 – 16 September 276
- Monarch: Emperor Wu of Jin

Personal details
- Born: 217 Xiangfen County, Shanxi
- Died: 19 May 282 (aged 65)
- Spouses: Li Wan; Guo Huai
- Relations: Jia Hun (brother)
- Children: Jia Bao; Jia Yu; Jia Nanfeng; Jia Wu; Jia Limin; one unnamed son
- Parents: Jia Kui (father); Lady Liu (mother)
- Occupation: Politician
- Courtesy name: Gonglü (公閭)
- Posthumous name: Duke Wu (武公)
- Peerage: Duke of Lu (魯公)

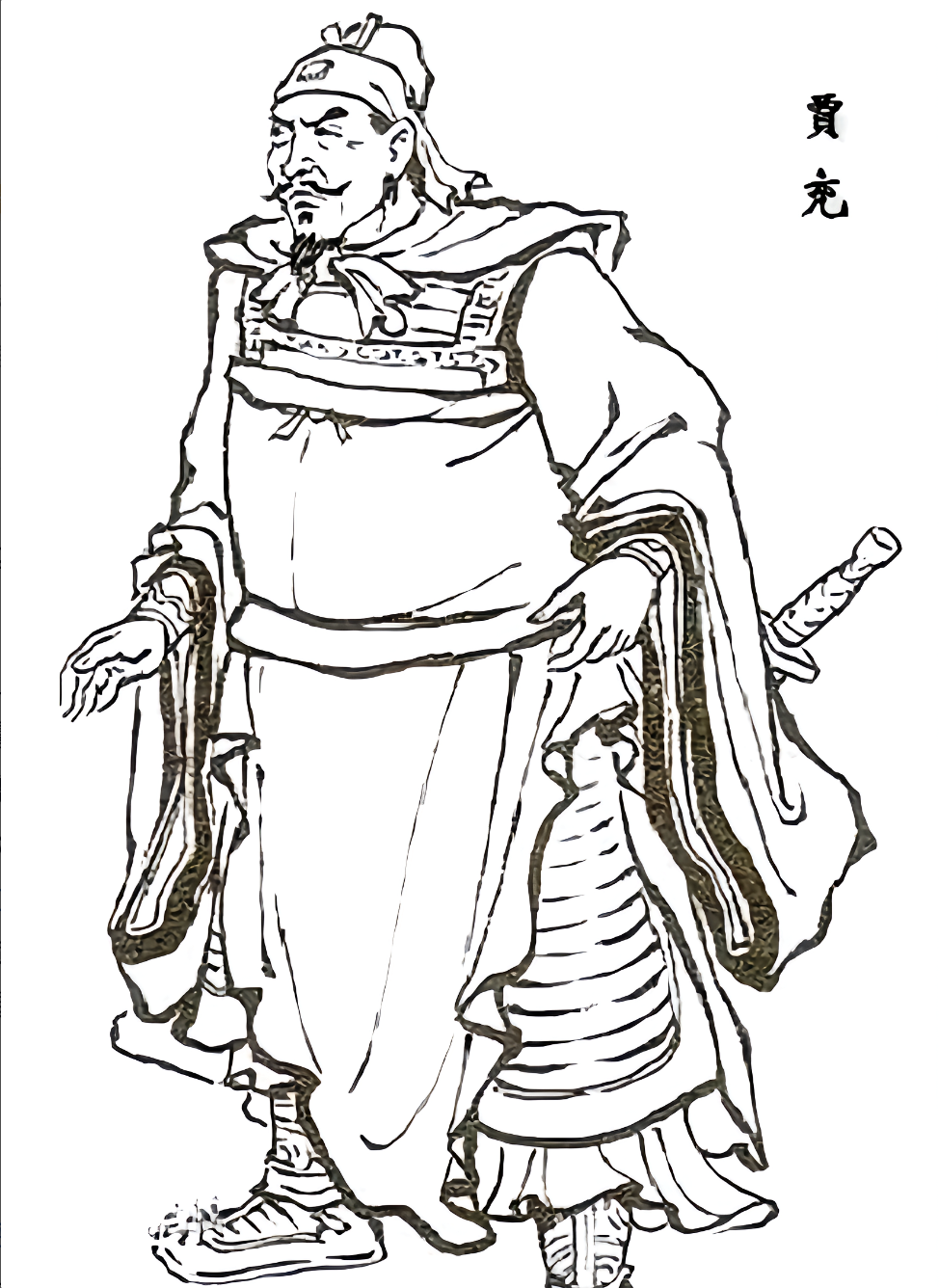

Jia Chong (217 – 19 May 282 (Note: According to Sima Yan's biography in Book of Jin, Jia Chong died on the gengwu day of the 4th month of the 3rd year of the Taikang era of his reign. This corresponds to 19 May 282 on the Julian calendar.)), courtesy name Gonglü, was a Chinese politician who lived during the late Three Kingdoms period and early Jin dynasty of China. He started his career as an advisor to Sima Shi and Sima Zhao, the regents of the state of Cao Wei in the Three Kingdoms era, and subsequently served as an official in the court of Sima Zhao's son, Sima Yan (Emperor Wu), after the establishment of the Jin dynasty.

== Early life and career in Cao Wei ==
Jia Chong's father, Jia Kui, was a military general in Wei and was considered an epitome of faithfulness to the state. He did not have a son until late in his life; (Note: Jia Kui was about 43 years old when Jia Chong was born.) when Jia Chong was born, he was very pleased. (Note: Jia Kui was so pleased that he used the verb "充闾" (chōng lǘ; "bringing glory to the family") as Chong's name and courtesy name.) Jia Chong's mother was Lady Liu (柳氏; fl.210 - 266 (Note: Jia Chong's biography in Book of Jin recorded that when Jia was made Duke of Lu (in Feb 266, when the Jin dynasty was established), Lady Liu was made Lady Dowager of Lu (鲁国太夫人).)). Jia Chong inherited his father's marquis title after the latter's death in 228. He later served under the regent Sima Shi, and then under Sima Shi's younger brother and successor, Sima Zhao. In 257, Sima Zhao sent him to probe the general Zhuge Dan's intentions should he decided to usurp the Wei throne. Zhuge Dan, then stationed at Shouchun, rebuked Jia Chong when the latter incessantly praised Sima Zhao in front of him. After Jia Chong returned to the capital Luoyang, he warned Sima Zhao that Zhuge Dan would most likely be unwilling to submit to his regency. Sima Zhao therefore summoned Zhuge Dan back to the capital, forcing him to start a rebellion that was quickly crushed. After the incident, Jia Chong became even more highly regarded by Sima Zhao.

In June 260, the Wei emperor Cao Mao, unable to contain his anger about Sima Zhao's monopolisation of power, attempted a coup d'état to try to take back power from the regent. When forces led by Sima Zhao's brother Sima Zhou quickly collapsed against Cao Mao's forces, it was Jia Chong who was willing to stand against the emperor and who further ordered his subordinate, Cheng Ji (成濟), to take any measure to defeat the emperor and his loyalists. Cheng Ji killed Cao Mao by spearing him to death. In the aftermath of the incident, the people demanded for Cheng Ji and Jia Chong to be executed. Sima Zhao considered the matter for more than 10 days, eventually resolving to kill Cheng Ji (and his clan) but sparing Jia Chong, not wanting to execute someone who had been so loyal to him. From that point on, however, Jia Chong's reputation among the people was one of regicide. (Note: A Wei Mo Zhuan annotation in Cao Mao's annals in Sanguozhi recorded that Jia gave explicit orders to Cheng Ji and his brother to kill the emperor. However, most other records' account (such as Han Jin Chun Qiu and the Jin Ji by Gan Bao (both cited by Pei Songzhi in his annotations to Cao Mao's biography in Sanguozhi), and Sima Zhao's and Jia Chong's biographies in Book of Jin) was that Jia's orders were ambiguous.)

Jia Chong also played a key role in Sima Zhao's suppression of Zhong Hui's rebellion in 264. Before the rebellion, Sima Zhao had foreseen that Zhong Hui was likely to rebel against Wei and had made preparations beforehand, including putting Jia Chong in charge of an army to counter any possible attack from Zhong Hui. Zhong Hui was killed by his soldiers who, unwilling to join his rebellion, mutinied against him.

== Career under the Jin dynasty ==
After Sima Zhao's death in September 265, his son Sima Yan forced the last Wei emperor Cao Huan to abdicate the throne to him in February 266, thus ending Wei's existence and replacing it with the Jin dynasty. Jia Chong was enfeoffed as the "Duke of Lu" on 9 February 266. As a loyal subject of the Sima family, Jia continued to be an important figure in the Jin government. Emperor Wu commissioned him to draft the laws of the Jin dynasty, initially considered to be far more merciful than the strict laws under the Wei regime. However, uneven enforcement of these laws meant that the main beneficiaries were nobles.

For years, Jia Chong had a political rivalry with Ren Kai (任愷) and Yu Chun (庾純); this rivalry intensified after Sima You married Jia Bao. In 271, Ren Kai and Yu Chun were able to persuade Emperor Wu to send Jia Chong to lead Jin forces to guard the Guanzhong region and fend off attacks from Di and Qiang (氐羌) rebels; Jia Chong was appointed overall in charge of military affairs for the provinces of Qinzhou and Liangzhou on 17 September. (Note: In his Zizhi Tongjian Kaoyi, Sima Guang noted that both Sanshi Guo Chun Qiu and Jin Chun Qiu dated this event to the 2nd month of the 8th year of the Tai'shi era (correspond to 17 Mar to 14 Apr 272 in the Julian calendar), while Emperor Wu's biography in Jin Shu dated the event to the 7th month of the 7th year of the Tai'shi era. Sima's opinion was that both Chun Qius were erroneous as they seemed to have conflated this event with the marriage of Jia Nanfeng and Sima Zhong, which was dated to the 2nd month of the 8th year of the Tai'shi era.) Jia did not want to fight the rebels at all; he sought advice from Xun Xu (荀勖) on how to avoid being sent into battle. Xun's advice was to arrange a wedding between one of his daughters and the crown prince. Xun Xu then volunteered himself for the task. With his flattery skills and the assistance from Emperor Wu's wife Empress Yang and Xun Yi (荀𫖮), Emperor Wu agreed to the marriage. At the same time, there was heavy snowfall in the capital Luoyang, with the snow reaching the depth of two chi. In addition, Yang Hu worked behind the scenes to help Jia, earning Jia's gratitude. In 272, Jia Chong retaliated against Ren Kai and Yu Chun and succeeded in forcing them out of politics. (Note: Ren Kai's biography in vol.45 of Jin Shu recorded that after Jia's machinations, Ren held a series of minor/ceremonial positions. Despite Jia's death in May 282, Ren's fortunes did not improve. On 28 Dec 283, Wei Shu (魏舒) was made situ. Ren Kai felt particularly aggrieved as when Wei Shu was a minor official, Ren had recommended Wei for a position. While Wei had become situ, Ren was now an official of lower rank. Ren then fell ill and died at the age of 61 (by East Asian reckoning), probably in Jan 284.) (Note: Vol.79 of Zizhi Tongjian recorded that Yu Chun was the Intendant of Henan in 271-272. At a banquet in 272, Yu had reminded Jia of his role in the death of Cao Mao (Tongjian and Yu Chun's biography in vol.50 of Jin Shu had different accounts of the conversation between the two). In his annotations to Tongjian, Hu Sanxing, citing Sima Guang's Zizhi Tongjian Kaoyi, indicated that Sanshi Guo Chun Qiu dated the banquet to the 11th month of that year (7 Dec 272 to 5 Jan 273 in the Julian calendar), while Jin Chun Qiu dated the banquet to the ji'si day of the 10th month of that year (no corresponding date in the Julian calendar); Sima Guang believed that both dates were wrong. Thus, Tongjian dated the banquet to late winter of that year, without giving a more specific date. Humiliated, Jia submitted a memorial to the throne requesting to be relieved of his positions, while Yu also submitted a memorial of self-admonition. Like Ren, Yu later held a series of minor positions until his death at the age of 64 (by East Asian reckoning) in an unknown year. Yu Chun was a brother of Yu Liang's grandfather.)

Between August 272 and 274, while Xiahou He was still Intendant of Henan, Emperor Wu became gravely ill, and the Jin court considered making Sima You the next emperor, rather than Emperor Wu's son and crown prince Sima Zhong. Xiahou told Jia, "Your relations with both sons-in-law are equal. An heir should be chosen based on his virtues." Jia did not comment on the statement; after Emperor Wu heard about the incident, he moved Xiahou to the post of Minister of the Household, and deprived Jia of his military command, while allowing Jia to retain his titles and treatment in court. On 16 September 276, Jia Chong was made Grand Commandant; he was replaced as Minister of Works by Sima You.

In 279, Emperor Wu wanted to launch a major invasion against Eastern Wu, the last of the Three Kingdoms, as part of his grand plan to reunify China under the Jin dynasty. Jia Chong opposed the emperor's idea and argued that Wu was too difficult to conquer. Emperor Wu not only ignored his advice, but also appointed him as the coordinator of a six-pronged attack on Wu. When Jia Chong declined, Emperor Wu told him to coordinate anyway, or else the emperor himself would personally coordinate. Jia Chong relented, but continued to oppose military action. In early 280, despite some military successes against Wu, Jia Chong continued to press for the invasion to be stopped after Jin forces had conquered the western half of Wu. Soon after he wrote a memorial to Emperor Wu arguing against the campaign, the Wu emperor Sun Hao surrendered to the Jin dynasty, thus ending Wu's existence. Jia Chong felt so ashamed that he offered to resign. However, Emperor Wu did not accept the resignation and even rewarded him for what he perceived to be Jia's contributions during the campaign.

== Death ==
When Jia Chong became critically ill in 282, Emperor Wu bestowed upon him a special honour by ordering the crown prince Sima Zhong to pay a special visit to Jia. After Jia Chong died, his second wife Guo Huai (郭槐) wanted Jia Chong's maternal grandson, Han Mi (韓謐), to inherit his ducal title. Emperor Wu approved, even though it was considered inappropriate for a maternal grandson to inherit his maternal grandfather's title. Because of this, the official Qin Xiu (秦秀; son of Qin Lang), who was responsible for selecting important officials' posthumous names, initially wanted to select "Huang" (荒; literally "performer of illegal acts") as Jia's posthumous name, but Emperor Wu overrode Qin Xiu's recommendation and chose "Wu" (武; literally "martial") as Jia's posthumous name.

== Family ==
Jia Chong had a younger brother, Jia Hun (賈混), who held the title "Marquis of Yongping" (永平侯). Jia Hun had three sons, Jia Yi (賈彝), Jia Zun (賈遵) and Jia Mo (賈模), who served as officials under the Jin dynasty.

Jia Chong's first wife, Li Wan (李婉), (Note: Lady Li's name was not recorded in official histories, but a Fu Ren Ji annotation in vol.19 of Shishuo Xinyu gave her name as "Wan") was a daughter of Li Feng, who was executed by Sima Shi in 254 for allegedly conspiring with the Wei emperor Cao Fang to unseat Sima Shi from power. By that point in time, Li Wan had already bore Jia Chong two daughters: Jia Bao (賈褒) and Jia Yu (賈裕). As Jia Chong wanted to pledge his loyalty to Sima Shi, he divorced Li Wan, who was sent into exile.

Jia Chong then married Guo Huai (郭槐), a niece of the Wei general Guo Huai (郭淮). Guo Huai bore Jia Chong two daughters as well: Jia Nanfeng and Jia Wu (賈午). She also bore him a son, Jia Limin (賈黎民), but her unusual jealousy and cruelty doomed her son. One day, when Jia Limin was still a toddler, Jia Chong returned home and caressed his son, who was being carried by his wet nurse. Guo Huai saw this and misinterpreted it as her husband having an affair with the wet nurse, so she killed the wet nurse. Jia Limin was so distressed by his wet nurse's death that he fell sick and died. Guo Huai bore Jia Chong another (unnamed) son later, but the entire tragedy repeated itself when Guo Huai suspected her son's wet nurse of having an affair with her husband. Jia Chong had no son left to succeed him when he died.

Among Jia Chong's daughters, Jia Nanfeng married Emperor Wu's crown prince Sima Zhong and eventually became empress after Sima Zhong was enthroned as Emperor Hui. Jia Bao, one of Jia Chong's daughters born to his first wife, married Emperor Wu's younger brother, Sima You, the Prince of Qi. At one point, when Emperor Wu was ill, Sima You was touted as a possible candidate to be the next emperor if Emperor Wu died – instead of Emperor Wu's developmentally disabled son Sima Zhong. One official, Xiahou He, tried to persuade Jia Chong to support Sima You and pointed out that both the crown prince and Sima You were Jia's sons-in-law. However, Jia Chong declined to express support for Sima You. Another of Jia Chong's daughters born to Guo Huai, Jia Wu, married Han Shou (韓壽), and had a son, Han Mi (韓謐). Han Mi inherited his maternal grandfather's ducal title.

In February 266, when Emperor Wu ended the Cao Wei state and established the Jin dynasty, he declared a general amnesty for political prisoners under the former regime. Jia Chong's first wife, Li Wan, was thus allowed to return from exile. As Emperor Wu believed that Jia Chong wanted to have his first wife back, he offered to approve of Jia Chong having two formal spouses (both Li Wan and Guo Huai). However, Jia Chong never accepted Li Wan again despite pleas from his two daughters born to Li Wan. Instead, he had a separate residence built for Li Wan but never visited her. Guo Huai, who was jealous of Li Wan, secretly sent spies to carry out surveillance at Li Wan's house for any signs of visit from Jia Chong. Guo Huai herself then went to visit Li Wan once with the intention of humiliating her, but she ended up being humiliated herself when she tripped and landed at Li Wan's feet; she never visited Li Wan again. After Li Wan's death, Jia Nanfeng, who had become Emperor Hui's empress by then, did not allow Li Wan to be buried with Jia Chong. Li Wan was only interred together with Jia Chong in 300 CE after Jia Nanfeng was deposed from her position as empress. Sima You's and Jia Bao's son Sima Jiong was sent by Sima Lun to depose Jia Nanfeng due to the bad blood between the half-sisters.

Parents

- Father: Jia Kui (賈逵, 174 – 228), Marquis of Yangli Village (陽里亭侯)
- Mother: Lady Liu (柳氏)

Wives and concubines:

- Lady Li, of the Li clan (李氏), personal name Wan (婉), courtesy name Shuwen (淑文), daughter of Li Feng (李豐)
  - Jia Bao (賈褒), first daughter
    - married Sima You, Prince Qixian (齊獻王 司馬攸), a son of Sima Zhao (司馬昭), had issue
  - Jia Yu (賈裕), second daughter
- Lady Guo, of the Guo clan (郭氏), personal Huai (槐), daughter of Guo Pei (郭配)
  - Jia Nanfeng (賈南風), third daughter
    - married Sima Zhong and had issues (four daughters)
  - Jia Wu (賈午), fourth daughter
    - married Han Shou (韓壽) and had issues (two sons, including Jia Mi)
  - Jia Limin (賈黎民), first son
  - Second son

== In popular culture ==
Jia Chong is first introduced as a playable character in the eighth installment of Koei's Dynasty Warriors video game series.

== See also ==
- Lists of people of the Three Kingdoms
