= Annotated Records of the Three Kingdoms =

5th century text compiled by Pei Songzhi

Annotated Records of the Three Kingdoms (simplified Chinese: 三国志注; traditional Chinese: 三國志注; pinyin: Sānguó zhì zhù) by Pei Songzhi (372–451) is an annotation completed in the 5th century of the 3rd century historical text Records of the Three Kingdoms, compiled by Chen Shou. After the fall of the Eastern Jin, Pei Songzhi became the Gentleman of Texts under the Liu Song dynasty, and was given the assignment of editing the book, which was completed in 429. This became the official history of the Three Kingdoms period, under the title Sanguozhi zhu (Note: zhu meaning "notes").

Pei went about providing detailed explanations to some of the geography and other elements mentioned in the original. More importantly, he made corrections to the work, in consultation with records he collected of the period. In regard to historical events and figures, as well as Chen Shou's opinions, he added his own commentary. From his broad research, he was able to create a history which was relatively complete, without many of the loose ends of the original. Some of the added material was colourful and of questionable authenticity, possibly fictional. All the additional material made the book close to twice the length of the original. Pei Songzhi scrupulously cited his sources, and always introduced his opinion as such.

== List of texts used in Pei Songzhi's annotations ==
=== Official and private histories ===
Title	Translation	Author / Compiler	Notes	Locus of First Citation (Note: The references provided locate the first instance of the citation in Pei Songzhi's commentary, and for the vast majority of these sources, the reference can be understood to prepend an invisible "et passim". All are found in footnotes, whether or not a particular note is specified. The pagination follows the Zhonghua Publishing standard version, but the Dingwen Printing version (Taipei, 1977) uses identical pagination.)
帝王世紀; Diwang Shiji	The Era of Sovereigns	Huangfu Mi	Deeds of emperors and kings since legendary times	38.975, n 3
典略; Dianlüe		Yu Huan	Believed to be based on parts of Weilüe	1.45, n 1
高士傳; Gaoshi Zhuan		Huangfu Mi	Contains biographies of people from the Three Sovereigns and Five Emperors era to the Three Kingdoms period	11.355
漢紀; Han Ji	Annals of Han	Yuan Hong	Annalistic history of the Later Han	2.57–8, n 3
漢紀; Han Ji	Annals of Han	Zhang Fan (張璠)	Also known as Annals of the Later Han (後漢紀) May never have been completed. (Note: Pei Songzhi suspected Zhang Fan's (張璠) Hou Han Ji was unfinished because of the poor quality of the writing. See Records of the Three Kingdoms, 4.133.)	1.3, n 2
漢晉春秋; Han Jin Chunqiu	Chronicles of Han and Jin	Xi Zuochi	Records the history of Han Dynasty up to the Western Jin Dynasty	1.20
漢書; Han Shu	Book of Han	Hua Qiao (華嶠)	Hua Qiao was a grandson of Hua Xin. Records the history of the late Eastern Han Dynasty. Also known as Later Book of Han (漢後書). Not to be confused with the Book of Han by Ban Biao and his children.	6.177
漢書注; Han Shu Zhu	Annotated Book of Han	Ban Gu and Ban Zhao; Ying Shao, annotation	Official history of the Western Han Dynasty. Extant.	1.36, n 5
漢魏春秋; Han Wei Chunqiu	Chronicles of Han and Wei	Kong Yan (孔衍)	Historical record of the late Han Dynasty and Wei Dynasty	1.46, n 2
後漢書; Hou Han Shu	Book of the Later Han	Xie Cheng (謝承)	Records the history of the late Han Dynasty. Not to be confused with Fan Ye's Book of the Later Han. Xie Cheng was a younger brother of Sun Quan's wife Lady Xie.	1.6–7 n 5
華陽國志; Huayang Guo Zhi	Chronicles of Huayang	Chang Qu	Records the history of Ba–Shu (巴蜀; present-day Sichuan and Chongqing) from the Han Dynasty to the Jin Dynasty	32.875, n 2
交廣記; Jiaoguang Ji	Records of Jiao and Guang provinces	Wang Yin (王隱)	Records the geographical history of Jiao and Guang provinces	60.1385
晉惠帝起居注; Jin Huidi Qiju Zhu	Notes on Daily Life in Emperor Hui of Jin's Time		Records about events in the reign of Emperor Hui of Jin	8.262, n 2
晉泰始起居注; Jin Taishi Qiju Zhu	Notes on Daily Life in Taishi of Jin		Records about events in the Taishi era (265-274) of the reign of Emperor Wu of Jin	35.932–3
晉紀; Jin Ji	Annals of Jin	Gan Bao	Records the history of the Western Jin Dynasty	3.145 n 1
晉書; Jin Shu	Book of Jin	Wang Yin (王隱)	Records the history of the Western Jin Dynasty. Co-written by Wang Yin's father Wang Quan (王銓). Not to be confused with the official history of the Jin Dynasty, the Book of Jin by Fang Xuanling et al.	1.49, n 3
晉書; Jin Shu	Book of Jin	Yu Yu (虞預)	Yu Yu's Book of Jin is believed to have been plagiarised from correspondence with Wang Yin (王隱)	21.605–6
晉陽秋; Jin Yang Qiu		Sun Sheng	Records the history of the Jin Dynasty up to Emperor Ai of Jin's time	8.253, n 2
九州春秋; Jiuzhou Chunqiu	Annals of the Nine Provinces	Sima Biao	Records the history of the late Han Dynasty in ten fascicles	1.4
九州記; Jiuzhou Ji	Records of the Nine Provinces	Xun Chuo (荀綽)	Divided into nine volumes, each covering one of the Nine Provinces. (Note: Most historiographers (including Zhao Yi and Qian Daxin, 1700s; and Shen Jiaben, early 1900s) consider Jiuzhou Ji to have been a single work which included both Jizhou Ji and Yanzhou Ji. Wang Zuyi (王祖彝), in 1956, considered the work to have been nine separate volumes, and listed them as distinct works cited by Pei Zongzhi. See Gao Min, p 13.)	11.336
靈帝紀; Lingdi Ji	Annals of Emperor Ling	Liu Ai (劉艾)	Records about Emperor Ling of Han	1.45, n 1
默記; Mo Ji	Records Written from Memory	Zhang Yan (張儼)	Records of Zhuge Liang and others	35.935–6
三朝錄; San Chao Lu	Records of the Three Dynasties	Zhang Wen? (Note: The historical bibliography in the Book of Sui does not record a San Chao Lu, but it does record a San Chao Lüe (三朝略), written by Zhang Wen. See Gao Min, 12.)	Information on Sun Lang (孫朗)	51.1213; biography of Sun Kuang
三國評; San Guo Ping	Commentary on the Three Kingdoms	Xu Zhong (徐眾)	Commentary on events in the Three Kingdoms period	7.237
史記; Shiji	Records of the Grand Historian	Sima Qian	First complete history. Extant.	19.568–9, n 2; biography of Cao Zhi
世語; Shiyu	Accounts of this Generation	Guo Song (郭頒)	Also known as Wei Jin Shiyu (魏晉世語), and not to be confused with Shishuo Xinyu, which is sometimes shortened to Shiyu as well. A particularly poor historical text. (Note: Although he quotes from it extensively, Pei Songzhi had serious reservations about Guo Song's (郭頒) Wei Jin Shiyu, calling it "lame, shallow, and wholly without rhythm". He decries the Shiyu as the poorest history he has consulted, and laments that its errors have passed through sourcing into the works of Sun Sheng and Gan Bao. See Records of the Three Kingdoms, 4.133)	1.2, n 3
蜀本紀; Shu Benji	Basic Annals of Shu	Qiao Zhou	Records about Liu Bei	32.889, n 1
蜀記; Shu Ji	Records of Shu	Wang Yin (王隱)	Records about the history of Shu	18.547, n 2; biography of Pang De
通語; Tongyu	Complete Accounts	Yin Ji (殷基)	Accounts of the beginnings of the Jin Dynasty	44.1062, n 1
魏紀; Wei Ji	Annals of Wei	Yin Dan (殷澹)		19.558, n 1; biography of Cao Zhi
魏略; Weilüe	Brief History of Wei	Yu Huan		1.18
魏末傳; Wei Mo Zhuan	Records of the End of Wei		Records events that occurred near the end of the Wei state	3.91, n 2
魏氏春秋; Wei Shi Chunqiu	Chronicles of the Ruling Family of Wei	Sun Sheng	Records the history of Wei in chronological order	1.18
魏書; Wei Shu	Book of Wei	Wang Chen, Xun Yi, Ruan Ji	Compiled after the fall of Wei	1.1 n 1
吳紀; Wu Ji	Annals of Wu	Huan Ji (環濟)		53.1247, n 4
吳歷; Wu Li	History of Wu	Hu Chong (胡沖) (Note: son of Hu Zong)		2.89
吳錄; Wu Lu	Records of Wu	Zhang Bo (張勃)		37.954, n 2
吳書; Wu Shu	Book of Wu	Wei Zhao		1.11, n 1
吳志; Wu Zhi	Records of Wu			1.6, n 3
獻帝春秋; Xiandi Chunqiu	Chronicles of Emperor Xian	Yuan Wei (袁暐)	Records about Emperor Xian of Han.	1.12
獻帝起居注; Xiandi Qiju Zhu	Notes on Emperor Xian's Daily Life		Records the events in the reign of Emperor Xian of Han	1.22, n 2
續漢書; Xu Han Shu	Continuation of the Book of Han	Sima Biao	Records about the late Eastern Han Dynasty	1.1–2

=== Government documents ===
Title	Translation	Author / Compiler	Notes	Locus of First Citation
百官名; Baiguan Ming	Official Posts		Register of Officials during the Jin Dynasty	12.390; biography of Sima Zhi (司馬芝)
禪晉文; Shan Jin Wen	On the Abdication to Jin		Cao Wei court document outlining their position on the succession of power	14.455 n 2; biography of Jiang Ji
太康三年地記; Taikang San Nian Diji	Land Survey of 282 (Note: The Book of Sui records a Yuankang San Nian Diji, which would be dated to 293 rather than 282. This may be the same record as quoted by Pei Songzhi. See Book of Sui, 33.984)		Government survey of population and local conditions	22.637 n 1; biography of Chen Qun
魏郊祀奏; Wei Jiaosi Zou	Memorandum on Wei's Biannual Nature Sacrifice		Government document of Cao Wei	2.83
魏名臣奏; Wei Mingchen Zou	Memorials of Famous Ministers of Wei	Chen Shou	Compiled in the Zhengshi era (240–249) of the reign of Cao Fang.	3.111–2
咸熙元年百官名; Xianxi Yuannian Baiguan Ming	Official Posts of the Opening Year of the Xianxi Period		Register of officials of Cao Wei in 264	28.794
獻帝傳; Xiandi Zhuan	Biography of Emperor Xian		Records about Emperor Xian of Han. Supplementary to Xiandi Ji. Contains memorials sent by various officials to Emperor Xian, urging the latter to abdicate in favour of Cao Pi.	1.39–40, n 3

=== Individual, family, and group biographies ===
Title	Translation	Author / Compiler	Notes	Locus of First Citation
邴原別傳; Bing Yuan Biezhuan	Unofficial Biography of Bing Yuan		Records and letters of Bing Yuan (邴原) and associates	11.351–4
曹瞞傳; Cao Man Zhuan	Biography of Cao Man		Records about Cao Cao's life prior to his rise to power	1.1 n 1
曹志別傳; Cao Zhi Biezhuan	Unofficial Biography of Cao Zhi		Records about Cao Zhì (曹志), son of Cao Zhí	19.577 n 2; biography of Cao Zhi
陳留耆舊傳; Chenliu Qijiu Zhuan	Biographies of the Seniors of Chenliu	Su Lin (蘇林)	Contains biographies of people from Chenliu (陳留)	24:683, n 2; biography of Gao Rou
陳氏譜; Chen Shi Pu	Chen Family Genealogy		Records about Chen Tai and his family	22:641 n 2; biography of Chen Qun
程曉別傳; Cheng Xiao Biezhuan	Unofficial Biography of Cheng Xiao		Records about Cheng Xiao (程曉)	14.431, n 2
楚國先賢傳; Chuguo Xianxian Zhuan	Biographies of the Departed Worthies of Chu		Contains biographies of people from Jing Province	4.141
崔氏譜; Cui Shi Pu	Cui Family Genealogy		Records about Cui Lie (崔烈) and his family, the Cui clan of Boling	35.911, n 3
杜氏新書; Du Shi Xinshu	Mr Du's New Book	(Note: Shen Jiaben gives Du Du (杜篤) as the eponymous Mr Du; the Book of Sui gives Du Yi (杜夷). See Gao, p 18.)	History of the Du family. Also known as Du Shi Youqiu Xinshu (杜氏幽求新書).	16.497; biography of Du Ji
費禕別傳; Fei Yi Biezhuan	Unofficial Biography of Fei Yi		Records about Fei Yi	44.1061, nn 1–3
顧譚傳; Gu Tan Zhuan	Biography of Gu Tan	Lu Ji (Note: Pei Songzhi cites a number of works written by Lu Ji, including Bian Wang Lun, Da Mu Fu, Lu Xun Ming, and Gu Tan Zhuan. A single collection of Lu Ji's works was available by the Liang Dynasty at the latest. See Book of Sui, volume 35, p 1063; Lu Ji Ji, preface, p 9. It is clear from his citation style that Pei Songzhi did not have access to a collection. When he does cite a collection by name (Cao Cao's Cao Gong Ji, or Cao Zhi's Chen Si Wang Ji, the collection is placed in the main table, while individual titles present in modern collections (Cao Cao's Bao Shang Ling, Cao Zhi's Bian Dao Lun) are placed in the second table to indicate uncertainty as to what title Pei Songzhi was citing. Since he never cites a collection of Lu Ji's works, all individual titles are placed in the main table to reflect the titles Pei Songzhi had available.)	Biography of Gu Tan	52.1231, n 1
管輅別傳; Guan Lu Biezhuan	Unofficial Biography of Guan Lu	Guan Chen (管辰)	Records about Guan Lu	29.811; biography of Guan Lu
毌丘儉志記; Guanqiu Jian Zhi Ji	The Records of Guanqiu Jian		Likely an unofficial, family-style biography of Guanqiu Jian	3.112
郭林宗傳; Guo Linzong Zhuan	Biography of Guo Linzong		Biography of Guo Tai (郭泰)	22.648
郭氏譜; Guo Shi Pu	Guo Family Genealogy		Records about Guo Huai and his family	26.734
漢末名士錄; Han Mo Mingshi Lu	Records of Famous People of the Late Han Dynasty			6.192
胡氏譜; Hu Shi Pu	Hu Family Genealogy		Records about Hu Zhi (胡質) and his family	27.741; biography of Hu Zhi
華佗別傳; Hua Tuo Biezhuan	Unofficial Biography of Hua Tuo		Records about Hua Tuo	29.802; biography of Hua Tuo
嵇康別傳; Ji Kang Biezhuan	Unofficial Biography of Ji Kang	Ji Xi (嵇喜)		21.606; Biography of Ji Kang
嵇氏譜; Ji Shi Pu	Ji Family Genealogy		Records about Ji Kang and his family	20.583; biography of Cao Lin (曹林)
機雲別傳; Ji Yun Biezhuan	Unofficial Biographies of [Lu] Ji and [Lu] Yun		Records about Lu Ji and Lu Yun (陸雲), grandsons of Lu Xun	58.1360–1, n 2
家傳; Jia Zhuan	The Story of My Family	Cao Cao	The Cao family's background and lineage	14.455 n 2; biography of Jiang Ji
江表傳; Jiang Biao Zhuan		Yu Pu (虞溥)	Contains biographies of people from the Jiangnan region	1.39–40
晉諸公贊; Jin Zhugong Zan	Appraisal of Officials of Jin	Fu Chang (傅暢) (Note: grandson of Fu Gu)	Contains biographies of officials in the Wei and Jin courts	4.138
孔氏譜; Kong Shi Pu	Kong Family Genealogy		About Kong Yi (孔乂) and his family	16.514–5; biography of Cang Ci
會稽典錄; Kuaiji Dianlu	Esteemed Records of Kuaiji	Yu Yu (虞預)	Contains records of people from Kuaiji (會稽)	46.1100, n 10
會稽邵氏家傳; Kuaiji Shao Shi Jia Zhuan	Genealogy of the Shao Family of Kuaiji		Records about Shao Chou (邵疇) and his family	48.1170–1
零陵先賢傳; Lingling Xianxian Zhuan	Biographies of the Departed Worthies of Lingling		Contains biographies of people from Lingling (零陵)	6.216, n 5
劉氏譜; Liu Shi Pu	Liu Family Genealogy		Records about Liu Yi (劉廙) and his family	21.617, n 4
劉廙別傳; Liu Yi Biezhuan	Unofficial Biography of Liu Yu		Records about Liu Yi (劉廙)	21.614–5, n 2
廬江何氏家傳; Lujiang He Shi Jia Zhuan	Genealogy of the He Family of Lujiang			21.622, n 5
盧諶別傳; Lu Chen Biezhuan	Unofficial Biography of Lu Chen			22.653
陸氏祠堂像贊; Lu Shi Citang Xiang Zan			Records about Lu Xun and his family	58.1343
陸氏世頌; Lu Shi Shisong	Lu Family Genealogy		Records about Lu Xun and his family	58.1343
陸遜銘; Lu Xun Ming	Obituary Inscription of Lu Xun	Lu Ji		58.1349
潘尼別傳; Pan Ni Biezhuan	Unofficial Biography of Pan Ni		Records about Pan Ni (潘尼)	21.613, n 1
潘岳別傳; Pan Yue Biezhuan	Unofficial Biography of Pan Yue		Records about Pan Yue (潘岳)	21.613, n 1
裴氏家紀; Pei Shi Jia Ji	Pei Family Genealogy	Fu Chang (傅暢)		42.1024, n 3
平原禰衡傳; Pingyuan Mi Heng Zhuan	Biography of Mi Heng of Pingyuan		Life and letters of Mi Heng and associates	10.311, n 2
譜敘; Pu Xu	Discussion of the Genealogy (Note: It is unknown whose genealogy Hua Jiao narrates in his Pu Xu. Shen Jiaben suggested it was an independent genealogy of his own family. See Lu Yaodong, p 16.)	Hua Jiao (華嶠)	Deeds of Hua Xin (華歆), family, and associates	13.402, n 3
任嘏別傳; Ren Gu Biezhuan	Unofficial Biography of Ren Gu		Records about Ren Gu (任嘏)	27.748, n 6
汝南先賢傳; Ru'nan Xianxian Zhuan	Biographies of Departed Worthies of Runan	Zhou Fei (周斐) (Note: Zhou Fei was from the Zhou clan of Runan, and a great-grandfather of Zhou Yi.)	Contains biographies of people from Runan	23.658; biography of He Qia
阮氏譜; Ruan Shi Pu	Ruan Family Genealogy		About Ruan Wu (阮武) and his family	16.508; biography of Du Shu (杜恕)
三輔決錄注; Sanfu Jue Lu Zhu	Annotated Selected Records of Sanfu	Zhao Qi; Zhi Yu (摯虞), annotation	Records about people in the Sanfu area surrounding Guanzhong, Shaanxi	1.50, n 2
山濤行狀; Shan Tao Xingzhuang			Records of Shan Tao (山濤)	21.607
山陽公載記; Shanyang Gong Zaiji	Records of the Duke of Shanyang	Yue Zi (樂資)	Anecdotes related to Liu Xie (劉協, Emperor Xian of Han)	1.31, n 2
蜀世譜; Shu Shi Pu	Shu Genealogy	Sun Sheng		34.906, n 3
孫惠別傳; Sun Hui Biezhuan	Unofficial Biography of Sun Hui		Records about Sun Hui (孫惠)	51.1211, n 3
孫氏譜; Sun Shi Pu	Sun Family Genealogy		Records about Sun Zi (孫資) and his family	14.462
孫資別傳; Sun Zi Biezhuan	Unofficial Biography of Sun Zi		Records about Sun Zi (孫資)	14.457–9, nn 1, 2, 4
王弼傳; Wang Bi Zhuan	Biography of Wang Bi	He Shao (何劭)	Biography of Wang Bi	14.449, n 2
王朗家傳; Wang Lang Jia Zhuan	Wang Lang Family Biographies		About Wang Lang and his family	13.407
王氏譜; Wang Shi Pu	Wang Family Genealogy		Probably two separate documents, (Note: Gao Min reasons that based on the physical distance between the two Wang clans, and the fact that the Book of Sui records a family register of the Wangs of Taiyuan, the two instances in which Pei Songzhi cites Wang Shi Pu must have been citing two distinct documents. See Gao Min, 9.) one registering the Wang clan of Langye, the other recording the Wang clan of Taiyuan	Langye: 24.679; biography of Cui Lin; Taiyuan: 27.744; biography of Wang Xu
魏世譜; Wei Shi Pu	Genealogy of Wei	Sun Sheng		4.123, n 1
魏武故事; Wei Wu Gushi	Story of the Martial Emperor of Wei [Cao Cao]		Records of people and events associated with Cao Cao	1.18
文士傳; Wenshi Zhuan	Biographies of Scholars	(Note: According to the biography of Cao Xiu, the author of Wenshi Zhuan was Zhang Yin (張隱); according to the biography of Xun Yu, the author was Zhang Heng; according to the biography of Wang Can, the author was Zhang Zhi (張騭). Editors of historical bibliographies have concluded that the author was most probably Zhang Zhi (張騭). However we have no chronologically close proof of authorship, nor indeed any strong indication that there was only a single book named Wenshi Zhuan in circulation, rather than two or three written by different authors surnamed Zhang. See Gao Min pp 13–14.)	Biographies of various people	9.280; 10.312, n 2; biography of Xun Yu
吳質別傳; Wu Zhi Biezhuan	Unofficial Biography of Wu Zhi		Records about Wu Zhi	21.609–610
先賢行狀; Xianxian Xingzhuang	The Background of Departed Worthies		Biographical information of various people including Xu Qiu (徐璆)	1.30
獻帝記; Xiandi Ji	Records of Emperor Xian	(Note: Pei Songzhi does not name explicitly the compiler of Xiandi Ji. The Book of Sui gives Liu Fang (劉芳); modern scholars prefer Liu Ai (劉艾). See Gao, p 16.)	Records about Emperor Xian of Han.	1.13, n 2
襄陽記; Xiangyang Ji	Records of Xiangyang	Xi Zuochi	Contains biographies of people from Xiangyang (present-day Xiangyang, Hubei)	35.913, n 1
荀粲傳; Xun Can Zhuan	Biography of Xun Can	He Shao (何劭)	Biography of Xun Can (荀粲)	10.319–320
荀氏家傳; Xun Shi Jia Zhuan	Xun Family Genealogy		Records about Xun Yu, Xun You, and their family	10.316, n 1
荀勗別傳; Xun Xu Biezhuan	Unofficial Biography of Xun Xu		Records about Xun Xu	10.332
荀彧碑文; Xun Yu Beiwen	Epitaph of Xun Yu	Pan Xu (潘勗)	Xun Yu's epitaph	10.312, n 2; biography of Xun Yu
荀彧別傳; Xun Yu Biezhuan	Unofficial Biography of Xun Yu		Records about Xun Yu	10.315
逸士傳; Yishi Zhuan	Biographies of Hermits	Huangfu Mi	Stories of political recluses	1.31, n 1
益部耆舊傳; Yi Bu Qijiu Zhuan	Biographies of the Seniors of the Yi Region	(Note: At its first reference, Pei Songzhi explicitly attributes Yi Bu Qijiu Zhuan to Chen Shou. However, he later attributes both an Yi Bu Qijiu Zhuan and Yi Bu Qijiu Zhi (志) to one Chen Shu (陳術). See Records of the Three Kingdoms, 42.1027, biography of Li Zhuan (李譔). According to the biography of Chen Shou in the Chronicles of Huayang, Chen Shu was a contributor to a Ba–Shu Qijiu Zhuan, which prompted Chen Shou to compile Yi Bu Qijiu Zhuan. It is also attributed to Chen Shou in the Book of Jin. The Book of Sui attributes Yi Bu Qijiu Zhuan to a Chen Changshou (陳長壽). See Gao Min (2007), p 14. Yizhou Qijiu Zhuan, cited by Pei Songzhi only once, may be identified with Yi Bu Qijiu Zhuan.)	Contains biographies of people from Yi Province	31.866, n 4
英雄記; Yingxiong Ji	Chronicles of Heroes and Champions	Wang Can	Also known as Han Mo Yingxiong Ji (漢末英雄記; Chronicles of Heroes of the Late Han Dynasty). Records about the warlords of the late Han Dynasty.	1.6
虞翻別傳; Yu Fan Biezhuan	Unofficial Biography of Yu Fan		Records about Yu Fan	57.1317, n 3
庾氏譜; Yu Shi Pu	Yu Family Genealogy		Records about Yu Ni (庾嶷) (Note: brother of Yu Dun, great-grandfather of Yu Liang. Yu Liang was a great-grandfather of Pei Songzhi.) and his family	11.363, n 3
袁氏世紀; Yuan Shi Shiji	Annals of the Yuan Family		Records about Yuan Huan and his family	11.334
趙雲別傳; Zhao Yun Biezhuan	Unofficial Biography of Zhao Yun		Records about Zhao Yun	36.948–9
鄭玄別傳; Zheng Xuan Biezhuan	Unofficial Biography of Zheng Xuan		Records about Zheng Xuan	4.142
鄭玄傳; Zheng Xuan Zhuan	Biography of Zheng Xuan		Biography of Zheng Xuan	38.970; biography of Sun Qian
鍾會母傳; Zhong Hui Mu Zhuan	The Biography of My Mother	Zhong Hui	Biography of Zhong Hui's mother	28.784, .785–6
諸葛恪別傳; Zhuge Ke Biezhuan	Unofficial Biography of Zhuge Ke		Records about Zhuge Ke	64.1430, n 1
諸葛氏譜; Zhuge Shi Pu	Zhuge Family Genealogy		Records about Zhuge Liang and his family	35.932, n 2

=== Encyclopoediae, dictionaries, and references ===
Title	Translation	Author / Compiler	Notes	Locus of First Citation
博物記; Bowu Ji		(Note: The Bowu Ji may be identifiable with another work of Zhang Hua. See Gao Min, p 12.)	Encyclopoedia. Also contains deeds and legacy of Wang Can, Wang Kai (王凱), and of the descendants of Chen Shi.	11.339 n 1
博物志; Bowuzhi		Zhang Hua	Records about myths and legends, ancient history, natural science and miscellaneous things	1.54, n 2
方言注; Fangyan Zhu		Yang Xiong; Guo Pu, annotation	Dictionary of topolectal terms	40.996; 50.1197
風俗通義; Fengsu Tongyi		Ying Shao	Extant	6.179, n 6
決疑要注; Jue Yi Yao Zhu	Annotated Guide to Dispelling Doubts	Zhi Yu (摯虞)	Contains information on the manufacture of jade ornaments	21.599 n 3; biography of Wang Can
列女傳; Lienü Zhuan	Biographies of Exemplary Women	Huangfu Mi	Extant	9.293
三蒼; Sancang		Guo Pu, annotation	Elementary educational text cited as a dictionary	1.30
神異經; Shen Yi Jing	Classic of Spirits and Oddities	Dongfang Shuo	Mythical places and creatures	4.118; biography of Cao Fang
四體書勢序; Sitishu Shi Xu	Preface to Forms of the Four Modes of Writing	Wei Heng (衛恆)	Calligraphic treatise	1.31, n 1
序傳; Xu Zhuan	Prefaces to Biographies	Sima Biao	Errata and corrigenda to biographies of the Three Kingdoms period and early Jin Dynasty	1.49, n 3
異物志; Yiwu Zhi	Records of the Bizarre	Yang Fu (楊孚)	Mythological places and things	4.117, n 2
志林; Zhilin	Forest of Records	Yu Xi	Information about the various kinds of imperial seal	46.1099, n 9

=== Poetry, essays, philosophy, and literature ===
Title	Translation	Author / Compiler	Notes	Locus of First Citation
百一詩; Bai Yi Shi		Ying Qu (應璩) (Note: nephew of Ying Shao)	Poetry	2.61–2
辨亡論; Bian Wang Lun	How Wu was Lost	Lu Ji	Essay on the fall of Eastern Wu	48.1179–82
抱朴子; Baopuzi		Ge Hong	Daoist classic. Extant.	48.1162 n 2
曹公集; Cao Gong Ji	Lord Cao Collection		Compilation of the works of Cao Cao. Extant.	38.970, n 2
陳思王集; Chen Si Wang Ji	Collected Works of Prince Si of Chen [Cao Zhi]	Cao Zhi	Poetry, letters, essays. Exant.	2.76
從軍詩; Congjun Shi	Embedded	Wang Can	Poetry in praise of Cao Cao's military prowess	1.47
大墓賦; Da Mu Fu	Rhapsody on the Great Tomb	Lu Ji	Poetry (Note: The text quoted by Pei Songzhi does not appear in the transmitted poem. See Records of the Three Kingdoms p 62; Collected Works of Lu Ji, pp 26–7.)	2.62
帝集; Di Ji	Collected Works of the Emperor	Cao Mao	Essays	4.138
典論; Dianlun		Cao Pi		1.7, n 6
傅咸集; Fu Xian Ji	Collected Works of Fu Xian	Fu Xian (傅咸) (Note: son of Fu Xuan)	Compilation of the works of Fu Xian (傅咸)	22.649
傅子; Fu Zi		Fu Xuan	Essays and poetry	1.26
嵇康集; Ji Kang Ji	Collected Works of Ji Kang	Ji Kang	Poetry and essays	21.606; Biography of Ji Kang
家戒; Jia Jie	Family Rules	Du Shu (杜恕) (Note: son of Du Ji and father of Du Yu)	Records of Zhang Ge (張閣)	11.354; biography of Bing Yuan
家誡; Jia Jie	Family Rules	Wang Chang (王昶)		1.52
孔融集; Kong Rong Ji	Collected Works of Kong Rong	Kong Rong	Essays, poetry, and memorials	11.345–6
禮論; Lilun	Discussion on Proprieties		Information on Xie Ci (謝慈)	59.1374
列異傳; Lieyi Zhuan		Cao Pi?	Collection of supernatural tales	13.405
明堂論; Mingtang Lun		Cai Yong	Meta-exegesis	4.142–3
潘岳集; Pan Yue Ji	Collected Works of Pan Yue	Pan Yue (潘岳)	Records the courtesy names of members of the family of Yang Ji (楊暨)	26.728
七略; Qi Lüe		Liu Xiang		38.974
啓蒙注; Qi Meng Zhu		Gu Kaizhi		3.104
啓事; Qishi	The Explanation of Matters	Shan Tao (山濤)	Also known as Shan Gong Qishi (山公啓事)	16.493, n 2; biography of Su Ze (蘇則)
神仙傳; Shenxian Zhuan	Stories of Immortals	Ge Hong		32.891
聖主得賢臣頌; Shengzhu De Xianchen Song	Ode to the Sagely Ruler Obtaining a Talented Minister	Wang Bao (王褒)	Poetry	42.1040, n 9; biography of Xi Zheng
書林; Shulin	Forest of Documents	Ying Qu (應璩)	Records the courtesy name of Zhan Qian (棧潛)	25.719
蜀都賦; Shu Du Fu	Rhapsody on the Capital of Shu	Zuo Si	Poetry	38.975, n 2
說苑; Shuoyuan	Garden of Stories	Liu Xiang	Historical and fictional stories.	19.568, n 1; biography of Cao Zhi
搜神記; Soushen Ji	In Search of the Supernatural	Gan Bao		2.75–6, n 3
頭責子羽		Zhang Min (張敏)		14.461, n 3
萬機論; Wan Ji Lun		Jiang Ji (蔣濟)		37.954, n 3
王朗集; Wang Lang Ji	Collected Works of Wang Lang	Wang Lang		13.411, n 2
魏都賦; Wei Du Fu	Wei Capital Rhapsody	Zuo Si	One of the Three Capitals Rhapsodies (三都賦)	11.360
文章敘錄; Wenzhang Xulu		Xun Xu (荀勗)	Also known as 雜撰文章家集敘 (Collected Analyses of Various Selected Authors)	9.273, n 3
文章志; Wenzhang Zhi		Zhi Yu (摯虞)		6.216, n 5
新論; Xin Lun	New Discourses	Huan Tan	Essays	42.1040, n 8
新序; Xin Xu	New Prefaces	Liu Xiang	Collection of historical and fictional tales. Extant.	21.614; biography of Liu Yi (劉廙)
楊都賦注; Yang Du Fu Zhu	Annotated Rhapsody on the Capital of Yang	Yu Chan (庾闡)	Poetry	47.1148, n 1
姚信集; Yao Xin Ji	Collected Works of Yao Xin	Yao Xin (姚信)	Report praising Lu Yusheng (陸鬱生), daughter of Lu Ji (陸績)	57.1329
異林; Yilin		Lu Yun's (陸雲) nephew		13.396, n 3
異同雜語; Yitong Zayu	Miscellaneous Words on Similarities and Differences	Sun Sheng	(Note: Pei Songzhi cites five similar titles of works compiled by Sun Sheng: Yitong Zaji, Zaji, Yitong Zayu, Zayu, and Yitong Ping. Of these, only Yitong Zayu appears in official bibliographies. Qian Daxin (1700s), Lin Guozan (林國贊; 1800s), and Shen Jiaben (early 1900s) treated the five titles as all referring to a single book, while Zhao Yi (1700s) took the opposite approach and considered treated the five titles as distinct works. Wang Zuyi (王祖彝; 1956) took Yitong Ping and Yitong Zayu to be two separate works, and the remaining three titles to refer to Yitong Zayu. Gao Min (2007) admits the possibility that all five titles refer to a single book, while raising the question of how the single scholar Pei Songzhi should come to cite the book by so many different monikers. Gao Min also quotes Sun Sheng's biography in the Book of Jin, which paints him as a prolific writer, in support of the theory that all five titles refer to distinct works. He advances a new theory, that Sun Sheng produced a work titled Yitong Ping, also referred to as Yitong Ji; and a work titled Zayu, also referred to as Zaji. He offers no explanation for Yitong Zayu, or why it should be the only title recorded by official bibliographies. See Gao Min, p 13. No theory is grounded in firm evidence.)	1.3, n 2
袁子; Yuanzi (Note: Probably refers to Yuanzi Zheng Lun (袁子正論), or Yuanzi Zheng Shu (袁子正書), the latter of which may have been a more complete version of the former. See Book of Sui, volume 34, p 998.)		Yuan Zhun (袁準) (Note: son of Yuan Huan)	Essays	20.591–2
越絕書; Yue Jue Shu			Stories about the ancient state of Yue, and its final king Goujian	42.1039, n 4; biography of Xi Zheng
戰略; Zhanlüe	Military Strategy	Sima Biao		6.211–2, n 2
張超集; Zhang Chao Ji	Collected Works of Zhang Chao	Zhang Chao (張超) (Note: brother of Zhang Miao)	Letter of recommendation for Yuan Yi (袁遺)	1.7, n 6
仲長統冒言表; Zhongchang Tong Mao Yan Biao	Zhongchang Tong's Report on Brave Speech	Miao Xi (繆襲)	Biography and reports of Zhongchang Tong (仲長統)	21.620
諸葛亮集; Zhuge Liang Ji	Collected Works of Zhuge Liang	Chen Shou	Also known as Zhuge Family Collection (諸葛氏集). Compilation of the works and writings of Zhuge Liang.	32.891

=== Correspondence ===
Title	Translation	Author / Compiler	Notes	Locus of First Citation
馬先生序; Ma Xiansheng Xu	Introduction to Elder Ma	Fu Xuan	Letter praising Ma Jun (馬鈞) of Fufeng	29.807–8
	untitled poem and response	Cao Jia (曹嘉) (Note: son of Cao Biao) and Shi Chong (石崇)		20.587–8, n 2; biography of Cao Biao (曹彪)
	untitled letter	Wang Biaozhi (王彪之)	Letter to Yin Hao, advising him on a course of diplomacy	21.618; biography of Liu Shao
	untitled announcement	Wen Qin and Guanqiu Jian	Announcement of the righteousness of their rebellion against Sima Yi	28.763–5; biography of Guanqiu Jian
	untitled letter	Wen Qin	Letter enlisting the aid of Guo Zhun (郭准), who was inconveniently dead at the time	28.766–7 biography of Guanqiu Jian
	untitled announcement	Wen Qin	Announcement of surrender to Eastern Wu	28.768; biography of Guanqiu Jian
	untitled stories	Guo Chong (郭沖)	Five dubious stories about Zhuge Liang (Note: Guo Chong's five stories on the deeds of Zhuge Liang are introduced in Records of the Three Kingdoms, 35.917. They are mentioned in the Shu Ji as being written essentially as propaganda to further Zhuge Liang's career. Pei Songzhi calls them "all dubious".)	35.917–8, .921–2 n 5, .922–3 n 2, .926 n 2
	untitled essay	Zhang Zhao	Essay on Ying Shao's policy regarding the taboo names of former monarchs	52.1219–1220; biography of Zhang Zhao

=== Classics ===
Quoting classics was an inescapable reality of Chinese political and academic life as early as the Eastern Zhou period. Pei Songzhi often cites classics in order to contextualize quotations made by speakers in Chen Shou's original text, and occasionally to explain the philosophy or background behind a person's actions. These works do not constitute historical sources for Pei Songzhi's purposes, but are included here for sake of completeness.

Title	Translation	Author / Compiler	Notes	Locus of First Citation
春秋公羊傳解詁; Chunqiu Gongyang Zhuan Jiegu	Exegesis of the Gongyang Zhuan	Gongyang Gao (公羊高); He Xiu (何休), annotation	Commentary to the Spring and Autumn Annals. Extant.	1.40, n 2; 5.161
春秋左氏傳集解; Chunqiu Zuo Shi Zhuan Jijie	Collected Exegesis of the Zuo Zhuan	Du Yu, annotation	Ruist historical tradition of heterogenous origin attached to the Spring and Autumn Annals. Extant.	24.678; biography of Han Ji (韓暨)
管子; Guanzi			Deeds and philosophy of Guan Zhong, prime minister of the state of Qi who brought Duke Huan of Qi to the position of hegemony. Extant.	2.60
國語; Guoyu	Sayings of the States	Wei Zhao, annotation	Speeches and rhetoric of the Eastern Zhou period. Extant.	1.40, n 8
淮南子; Huainanzi			Philosophical and scientific encyclopaedia, usually classified as a Daoist text. Extant.	42.1038
禮記注; Liji Zhu	Annotated Record of Rites	Zheng Xuan, annotation	Prescriptive ritual text. Extant.	3.108, n 2
論語; Lunyu	Analects	Kong Qiu	Confucian foundational text. Extant	38.974
呂氏春秋; Lüshi Chunqiu	Mr Lü's Spring and Autumn Annals	Lü Buwei	Encyclopoedia. Extant.	2.82, n 2
孟子; Mengzi	Mencius	Meng Ke	Confucian foundational text. Extant.	24.682
尚書注; Shangshu Zhu	Annotated Book of Documents	Zheng Xuan, annotation	Records of persons, speeches, and events in the Western Zhou period. Extant.	1.40, nn 3, 5, 6, 7
詩經; Shijing	Book of Odes		Poetry of the Zhou culture, from the pre-dynastic period to the Eastern Zhou period. Extant.	1.40, n 5
孫子兵法; Sunzi Bingfa	The Art of War		Treatise on military strategy and tactics. Extant.	27.744; biography of Wang Xu
戰國策; Zhan Guo Ce	Strategies of the Warring States	Liu Xiang	Fictional tales and exercises in persuasive rhetoric. (Note: For the nature of the Zhan Guo Ce, see Crump, pp 11–22, esp. p 15.) Extant.	21.615, n 3
莊子; Zhuangzi		Partially attributed to Zhuang Zhou	Daoist foundational text. Extant.	11.366

=== Texts of uncertain identity or disputable citation ===
Title	Translation	Author / Compiler	Notes	Locus of First Citation
異同評; Yitong Ping	Commentary on Similarities and Differences	Sun Sheng		1.21–2, n 2
雜記; Zaji	Miscellaneous Records	Sun Sheng		1.5, n 2
異同記; Yitong Ji	Records of Similarities and Differences	Sun Sheng		35.933, n 2
晉書; Jin Shu	Book of Jin	Gan Bao	May have referred to Gan Bao's Jin Ji, may have been a separate work. (Note: The traditional view is that, since no Jin Shu by Gan Bao is recorded in official bibliographies, Gan Bao's Jin Shu as cited by Pei Songzhi must have been referring to Gan Bao's Jin Ji. Lin Guozan (林國贊) and Wang Zuyi (王祖彝) considered Gan Bao's Jin Shu to have been a separate work. Gao Min strengthens this claim by noting a paragraph in which Pei Songzhi cites both a Jin Shu and Jin Ji attributed to Gan Bao. There is no conclusive evidence to support one theory or the other (Records of the Three Kingdoms, 9.187, nn 1–2). Pei Songzhi uses language compatible with the possibility that Gan Bao and Sun Sheng, who were contemporaries, collaborated on a Jin Shu. See Records of the Three Kingdoms, 4.133; Gao Min, 13.)	3.94
辨道論; Bian Dao Lun		Cao Zhi	Records of contemporary Daoist masters Gan Shi (甘始), Zuo Ci, and Xi Jian (郤儉). Cited by Pei Songzhi as an independent work, now part of Chen Si Wang Ji.	29.805–6
晉百官名; Jin Baiguan Ming	Official Posts of Jin		May be the same work as Baiguan Ming	16.493, n 2; biography of Su Ze (蘇則)
晉百官表; Jin Baiguan Biao	Report on Jin's Official Posts		May be the same work as Jin Baiguan Ming	35.933, n 1
武帝百官名; Wudi Baiguan Ming	Official Posts Under the Martial Emperor [of Jin]		Official register of government officials. May have been part of Baiguan Ming or Jin Baiguan Ming. (Note: Only Shen Jiaben and Gao Min consider Wudi Baiguan Ming to be a separate work, rather than a chapter of Jin Baiguan Ming or Baiguan Ming. See Gao, p 18.)	18.538, n 3; biography of Zang Ba
冀州記; Jizhou Ji	Records of Ji Province	Xun Chuo (荀綽) (Note: grandson of Xun Xu)	Part of Jiuzhou Ji.	9.305, n 2
兗州記; Yanzhou Ji	Records of Yan Province	Xun Chuo (荀綽)	Part of Jiuzhou Ji.	16.508; biography of Du Shu (杜恕)
益州耆舊傳; Yizhou Qijiu Zhuan	Biographies of the Seniors of Yi Province			38.967, n 1
益州耆舊雜記; Yizhou Qijiu Zaji	Miscellaneous Records of the Seniors of Yi Province		Believed to be an appendix or companion to Yi Bu Qijiu Zhuan. (Note: Yizhou Qijiu Zaji may be identifiable with Chen Shu's Yi Bu Qijiu Zhi or Xu (續) Yi Bu Qijiu Zhuan, listed without attribution in the Book of Sui. Gao Min, p 14)	31.867, n 1
耆舊; Qijiu	On Seniors		Cited once underneath Yi Bu Qijiu Zaji, very likely an abbreviated reference to same	45.1088
褒賞令; Baoshang Ling	Order on Appraisals and Rewards	Cao Cao	Part of the Cao Gong Ji (Note: Zhao Yi, Qian Daxin, and the editors of Records of the Three Kingdoms consider Baoshang Ling to be part of the Cao Gong Ji. Shen Jiaben, Wang Zuyi (王祖彝), and Gao Min consider it a distinct title. See Gao Min, p 16.)	1.23
立郊議; Li Jiao Yi	Deliberations Regarding the Establishment of the Biannual Nature Sacrifice	Jiang Ji	Records the epitaph of Cao Teng (Note: The Book of Sui records a collection of works by Jiang Ji, but does not mention Li Jiao Yi by name. Gao Min raises the possibility that this document is part of the larger Wei Jiaosi Zou. See Gao Min, p 7.)	14.455 n 2; biography of Jiang Ji
舊事; Jiu Shi	Old Matters		The careers of the sons of Wei Zi (衛茲) (Note: Only Shen Jiaben and Gao Min consider Jiu Shi to be a book title; Zhao Yi, Qian Daxin, Wang Zuyi (王祖彝), and the editors of the modern, punctuated Records of the Three Kingdoms read jiu shi as a common noun. If it is a book title, Jiu Shi may be identifiable with Han–Wei–Wu–Shu Jiu Shi (漢魏吳蜀舊事) or Jin–Song Jiu Shi (晉宋舊事). See Gao Min, p 12.)	22.649
孫綽評; Sun Chuo Ping	Sun Chuo's Critiques	Sun Chuo	Essays and commentary (Note: Pei Songzhi writes "孫綽評曰", which can be read as either "Sun Chuo critiqued, saying" or "Sun Chuo's Critiques say". Qian Daxin and Gao Min read the note in the latter fashion, proposing Sun Chuo's Critiques was part of his collected works, recorded in the Book of Sui as 晉衛尉卿孫綽集 (Collected Works of Sun Chuo, Chief Minister for the Palace Garrison of the Court of Jin). See Gao Min, 12. Zhao Yi, Shen Jiaben, Wang Zuyi (王祖彝), and the punctuators of the modern Records of the Three Kingdoms do not read the phrase in question as the title of a book.)	42.1031
輔臣贊; Fu Chen Zan	In Praise of the Supportive Ministers	Yang Xi (楊戲)	Records of politicians of Shu Han (Note: Pei Songzhi quotes from the Xiangyang Ji, which states the deeds of Pang Tong's brother Pang Lin (龐林) and his wife Xi Zhen (習禎) are related in a text named Fu Chen Zan. The note goes on to paraphrase their story, but it is unclear whether Pei Songzhi is paraphrasing this text or the paraphrase is present in the Xiangyang Ji.)	37.956; Pang Tong
樂廣傳; Yue Guang Zhuan	Biography of Yue Guang	Xie Kun (謝鯤) (Note: father of Xie Shang)	Information on the activities and legacies of the descendants of Pei Qian (Note: father of Pei Xiu) (Note: Pei Songzhi's reference to the Yue Guang Zhuan is beneath a citation from Jin Zhugong Zan, but Gao Min notes that the latter's compiler, Fu Chang (傅暢), predeceased at least one of the men discussed in the note, Pei Xian (裴憲), by a period of at least five years. Gao Min then goes on to undermine his own argument by stating that Xie Kun (謝鯤), author of the Yue Guang Zhuan, probably died a further four years prior to Fu Chang. See Gao Min, p 9.)	23.674; biography of Pei Qian
辛憲英傳; Xin Xianying Zhuan	Biography of Xin Xianying	Xiahou Zhan (夏侯湛)	Biography of Xin Xianying, daughter of Xin Pi (Note: The quotation from Xin Xianying Zhuan is below a citation from the Shiyu. The punctuators of the modern Records of the Three Kingdoms, following Zhao Yi and Qian Daxin, have made it clear they believe Pei Songzhi was quoting Xin Xianying Zhuan as carried by the Shiyu. Shen Jiaben, Wang Zuyi (王祖彝), and Gao Min accept Xin Xianying Zhuan as a work cited by Pei Songzhi, rather than a work cited by one of his sources.)	25.699–700
陸芝銘; Lu Zhi Ming	Funerary Inscription for Lu Zhi	Xiahou Zhan (夏侯湛)	Life and deeds of Lu Zhi (陸芝) (Note: Pei Songzhi simultaneously paraphrases from the funerary inscription of Lu Zhi (陸芝) and from Gan Bao's Jin Ji. The actual wording of the inscription is not directly quoted.)	9.292
漢官儀; Han Guan Yi	Etiquette of the Officials of Han	Ying Shao	Information on Han government procedures (Note: Pei Songzhi does not cite Han Guan Yi directly, and only mentions in passing that it and Huangfu Mi's Diwang Shiji agree with Yu Xi's Zhilin on the matter of imperial seals.)	46.1099, n 9

=== Other sources ===
Pei Songzhi occasionally quotes other historians without citing any book or document title. Sun Sheng, Gan Bao, and Xi Zuochi are especially common. These may have been marginal notes in Pei's copy of Records of the Three Kingdoms, or personal notes to which he had access. Rarely, Pei Songzhi will report hearsay without any attribution.

== Bibliography ==
- Crump, J.I., Jr., transl. Chan-Kuo Ts'e. Oxford: Clarendon Press, 1971.
- Fang Xuanling inter al., eds. 晉書 (Book of Jin), 648. Beijing: Zhonghua Publishing, 1974. 10 vols.
- Gao Min (高敏), 《三國志》裴松之注引書考 ("Books Used by Pei Songzhi on Noting of History of the Three Kingdoms"). Journal of Henan University of Science and Technology (Social Science), 25.3 (June 2007), pp 5–21.
- Lu Ji, 陸機集 (Collected Works of Lu Ji), Jin Taosheng (金濤聲), ed. Beijing: Zhonghua Publishing, 1982.
- Lu Yaodong (逯耀東), 裴松之三國志注引雜傳集釋 ("Collected Explanations of Various Biographies Cited in Pei Songzhi's Annotation of Records of the Three Kingdoms"). 台大歷史學報, 1 (May 1974), pp 1–18.
- Pei Songzhi, 三國志注 (Annotated Records of the Three Kingdoms). 429. Hong Kong: Zhonghua Publishing, 1971. 5 vols.
- Qian Daxin, 廿二史考異 (Examination of Discrepancies in the Twenty-Two Histories). 1797. Cited in Gao.
- Schaberg, David, A Patterned Past: Form and Thought in Early Chinese Historiography. Cambridge: Harvard University Press, 2001.
- Shen Jiaben, 沉簃籍先生遺書乙篇 (Mr Shen Yiji's Leftover Documents, Volume Two). 1910s. Cited in Gao.
- Wang Zuyi (王祖彝), 三國志人名錄 (List of Personal Names in Records of the Three Kingdoms). Commercial Press, 1956. Cited in Gao.
- Wei Zheng inter al., eds. 隋書 (Book of Sui), 636. Beijing: Zhonghua Publishing, 1973. 6 vols.
- Zhao Yi, 廿二史劄記 (Notebook of the Twenty-Two Histories). 1770s. Cited in Gao.
