= Sun Sheng (Jin dynasty) =

Jin dynasty historian and official; courtesy name Anguo (c.302–373)

- Traditional Chinese: 孫盛
- Simplified Chinese: 孙盛
Transcriptions
Standard Mandarin
- Hanyu Pinyin: Sūn Shèng

Anguo (courtesy name)
- Traditional Chinese: 安國
- Simplified Chinese: 安国
Transcriptions
Standard Mandarin
- Hanyu Pinyin: Ānguó

Sun Sheng (c.302–373 (Note: Knechtges (2006) gives 302–372 (p 11), but Sun Sheng's biography in the Book of Jin specifies that he died at the age of 72 (by East Asian reckoning) (p 2148))), courtesy name Anguo, was a Chinese historian and politician of the Jin dynasty. He was a native of Pingyao County, Jinzhong, Shanxi. He was described to be very studious, and was never seen without holding a book in his hand from his youth to his old age.

== Life ==
Sun Sheng's father Sun Xun (孫恂) was Grand Administrator of Yingchuan (潁川), in present-day Henan and Anhui. He was killed by bandits when Sun Sheng was nine, and the rest of the family fled to safety across the Yangtze River. Sun Sheng's grandfather Sun Chu (孫楚) was a grandson of Cao Wei official Sun Zi (孫資); Sun Sheng was also a cousin of Sun Chuo.

In his young adulthood, Sun Sheng achieved fame as a serious scholar of the I Ching, composing an essay which some of the leading luminaries of the time, including Yin Hao, Wang Meng, (Note: As the Wang Meng from Former Qin was more than 20 years younger than Sun, it is more likely that "Wang Meng" refers to the father of Wang Muzhi.) and Xie Shang (Note: Mather (1964) gives Xie An (p 370); late-Qing scholar Cheng Yanzhen (程炎震) disputes that by the time Xie An was present in Kuaiji, Sun Sheng would have been serving in Huan Wen's army (see 世說新語箋疏 [Shishuo Xinyu with annotations] 4.56).) were unable to debate with him. Parts of the essay, "The Symbols of the Book of Changes are More Subtle than the Visible Shapes of Nature", survived and have been translated by Richard B. Mather.

After entering politics, Sun Sheng served under Tao Kan, Yu Liang, (Note: According to vol.96 of Zizhi Tongjian, in 338, Yu Liang had plans to depose Wang Dao together with Xi Jian. Xi refused to join the plot; when Sun Sheng heard of Yu's plans, he convinced Yu not to implement them.) and Huan Wen; Sun accompanied Huan into Sichuan. (Note: This was the Conquest of Cheng-Han by Jin. While accompanying Huan, Sun spoke to the locals about Jiang Wei, and supposedly met Liu Yong's grandson.) On campaign, Huan Wen had taken his infantry to attack, and Sun Sheng was in charge of the weak, the elderly, and the baggage train, when they were suddenly set upon by thousands of bandits. The rearguard managed to rise to the occasion and drive them away. Huan Wen appointed Sun Sheng Marquis of Anhuai, in present-day Pingnan County, Guangxi, and he was attached to Huan Wen's household as a travelling secretary.

Following Huan Wen's first two northern campaigns, Sun Sheng was enfeoffed as Marquis of Wuchang (in present-day Pingjiang County, Hunan), and appointed Grand Administrator of Changsha. The poverty of his family drove him to engage secretly in trade; but although this breach of etiquette was discovered, he was not impeached, because of the great esteem in which he was held. He left Huan Wen's service under strained conditions, and ended his life in the position of Supervising Censor.

== Works ==
Sun Sheng wrote the Wei Shi Chunqiu (魏氏春秋; Chronicles of the Clans of Wei) and Jin Yangqiu (晉陽秋; Annals of Jin). (Note: According to Lidai Huizi Pu (历代讳字谱) by Zhang Weixiang (张惟骧), the word chun (春) was taboo during the reign of Emperor Jianwen of Jin and for the rest of the Eastern Jin era, as his mother's name was Zheng A'Chun (郑阿春). Thus, Chunqiu (春秋; "annals" or "chronicles") was amended to Yangqiu (阳秋), and so Sun Sheng's work should be called Jin Chunqiu. However, in subsequent eras, his work was still referred to as Jin Yangqiu. In Sima Guang's Zizhi Tongjian Kaoyi, the Jin Chunqiu cited was a separate work, by Tang-era scholar Du Yanye (杜延业); see vol.03 of Kaoyi.) A number of other works quoted by Pei Songzhi in his annotation of Records of the Three Kingdoms are attributed to Sun Sheng, including Yitong Zaji (異同雜記; Miscellaneous Records of Similarities and Differences), Shu Shi Pu (蜀世譜; Genealogy of Shu), and Wei Shiji (魏世籍; Records of the House of Wei). (Note: Sun himself commented on many events found in Sanguozhi; these were also included by Pei in his annotations.) All of his works have been lost, and survive now only in quotations.

== Titles and Appointments Held ==
- Adjutant (參軍事)
- Marquess of Anhuai County (安懷縣侯)
- Marquess of Wuchang County (吳昌縣侯)
- Grand Administrator of Changsha (長沙太守)
- Supervising Censor (秘書監)

== Family ==
- Great-great-grandfather: Sun Zi (d. 29 September or 28 November 251)

- Great-grandfather: Sun Hong (孫宏)

- Grandfather: Sun Chu (孫楚) (d. 293) (Note: Sun Chu's biography in Book of Jin also recorded that he was in his 40s just before he wrote a letter for Sima Zhao's envoys to Sun Hao. According to Sun Hao's biography in Sanguozhi, the diplomatic mission took place in the first year of his reign. Hence, it took place between September 264 (Sun Hao becoming Emperor of Wu) and January 265 (the year ends on 2 Feb 265 in the Julian calendar). Sun Chu was also known to be a good friend of Wang Ji, husband of Princess Changshan and son of Wang Hun. Sun Chu also warned Yang Jun that due to his sensitive position as both father-in-law and regent of Emperor Hui of Jin, he should include other members of the Sima clan in state affairs; Yang ignored him.)

- Father: Sun Xun (孫恂) (d. 311)
- Paternal cousin: Sun Chuo
- Children:
  - Sun Qian (孫潛)
  - Sun Fang (孫放)

== Sources ==
- Liu Yiqing [in Chinese] (2008) [440s]. Yu Jiaxi [in Chinese]; Zhou Zuhan (周祖漢); Yu Shuyi (余淑宜) (eds.). 世說新語箋疏 [Annotated New Account of the Tales of the World]. Beijing: Zhonghua Publishing. ISBN 9787101056471.
- Fang Xuanling; et al., eds. (1974) [648]. 晉書 [Book of Jin]. Beijing: Zhonghua Publishing.
- Giles, Herbert Allen (1898). A Chinese Biographical Dictionary. pp. 693.
- Mather, Richard B. (Oct–Dec 1964). "Chinese Letters and Scholarship in the Third and Fourth Centuries: The Wen-Hsüeh P'ien of the Shih-Shuo-Hsin-Yü". Journal of the American Oriental Society. 84 (4): 348–391. doi:10.2307/596774. JSTOR 596774.
- Mather, Richard B. (1976). Shih-shuo Hsin-yü: A New Account of Tales of the World, by Liu I-ch'ing, with commentary by Liu Chün. Minneapolis: University of Minnesota Press.
- Knechtges, David R. (Dec 2006). "Liu Kun, Lu Chen, and Their Writings in the Transition to the Eastern Jin". Chinese Literature: Essays, Articles, Reviews. 28: 1–66.
