= History of Song (book) =

Official history of the Song dynasty

- Chinese: 宋史
Transcriptions
Standard Mandarin
- Hanyu Pinyin: Sòng Shǐ
Southern Min
- Hokkien POJ: Sòng-sú

The History of Song or Song Shi (Chinese: 宋史; pinyin: Sòng Shǐ; Wade–Giles: Sung Shih) is one of the official Chinese historical works known as the Twenty-Four Histories of China that records the history of the Song dynasty (960–1279). It was commissioned in 1343 and compiled under the direction of First Minister Toqto'a and Prime Minister Alutu (traditional Chinese: 阿魯圖; simplified Chinese: 阿鲁图) during the Yuan dynasty (1271–1368) at the same time as the History of Liao and the History of Jin. Running to a total of 496 chapters, the History of Song includes biographies of the Song Emperors along with contemporary records and biographical sketches of Song dynasty politicians, soldiers and philosophers.

== Publication process ==
Kublai Khan endorsed a proposal by Liu Bingzhong and Wang E (王鶚; 王鹗, 1190–1273) for the compilation of historic records of the Song, Jin, and Liao dynasties but the compilation effort stalled for some time. In March 1343, the third year of Ukhaantu Khan, Emperor Huizong of Yuan's Zhizheng Era (至正年號; 至正年号), an Imperial edict ordered the creation of histories of the Song, Liao and Jin Dynasties. Under the overall supervision of Toktogan, Temür Daš (Chinese Tiemuertashi 鐵木兒塔識; 铁木儿塔识), He Weiyi, (賀惟一; 贺惟一), Zhang Qiyan (張起巖; 张起岩), Ouyang Xuan (歐陽玄; 欧阳玄), Li Haowen (李好文), Wang Yi (王沂) and Yang Zongduan (楊宗端) were given responsibility for the project with Woyuluntu (斡玉倫徒; 斡玉伦徒), Taibuhua (泰不華; 泰不华), Yu Wenzhuan (于文傳; 于文传), Gong Shidao (貢師道; 贡师道), Yu Que (餘闕; 余阙), Jia Lu (賈魯; 贾鲁) Wei Su (危素) and 23 others appointed as historiographers. Toktogan resigned in May 1344 to be replaced on the project by Prime Minister Alutu, even though the latter was not familiar with Chinese characters. The final book took only two and a half years to produce and was published in Zhejiang Province in 1346, the sixth year of the Zhizheng Era.

== Content ==
The History of Song with its 496 chapters is the largest of the Twenty-Four Histories. It contains 47 chapters of Imperial biographies, 162 chapters covering Song dynasty records (誌; 志; Zhì), 32 chapters of tables (showing genealogy, etc.) and 255 chapters of historical biographies. A work of enormous breadth, the History of Song contains more than 2,000 individual historical biographies, more than twice as many as the Old Book of Tang that chronicles the history of the Early Tang dynasty. In the section of the book covering Song dynasty records there are fifteen separate categories viz: astronomy, the system of five phases known as Wu Xing, the legal calendar (律曆; 律历), geography, rivers and water ways, Confucian rites, music, ceremonial weaponry and bodyguards (儀衛; 仪卫), military dress (輿服; 舆服), elections, government positions, consumer goods, the army and punishment together with art and culture. Altogether these chapters make up one third of the work. The historical biographies section of the History of Song is unsurpassed by any of the other Dynastic Histories; there are detailed descriptions of Song government structures from the central down to the local level. Sections covering consumer goods and the army are also well written with much more detail than found in the other Dynastic Histories. The fourteen chapters on consumer goods contain seven times the amount of information as the corresponding chapters of the Book of Tang. A total of seven chapters contain biographies of traitors and rebels including Cai Jing, Huang Qianshan (黃潛善), Qin Hui, Zhang Bangchang (張邦昌) and Liu Yu (劉豫).

Four chapters are dedicated to Confucian scholars, featuring individuals such as Cheng Hao, Cheng Yi, Zhang Zai, Zhou Dunyi, and Zhu Xi.

Chien includes a translation to English of the treatise on the salt monopoly contained in volumes 181–183. This treatise is the largest of the treatises in the Finance and Economics (食貨) section. Chien also includes maps in English corresponding to the main administrative regions described in volumes 85–90 comprising the Geography (地理) section.

== Evaluation ==
The ideology behind the History of Song is that of Neo-Confucianism, with coverage of the Confucian doctrines of loyalty, righteousness and ethics regarding the well-known scholars Zhou Dunyi, Cheng Hao, Cheng Yi, Zhang Zai and Zhu Xi amongst others. No less than 278 individuals feature in the section on loyalty and righteousness (《忠義傳》; Zhōngyì Zhuàn). Qing dynasty historian Qian Daxin (錢大昕) once said: "The History of Song esteems neo-confucianism, especially the school of Zhu Xi". Its compilation follows the principles of Confucian life. Fine logic and language is used to convey morality whilst eschewing utilitarianism. The book's style is also highly regarded and considered a model example. Wang Anshi's Xining Reforms (熙寧變法) are rejected by the History of Song whilst political reform campaigners including Lu Huiqing (呂惠卿), Zeng Bu (曾布) and Zhang Dun (章惇) feature in the section on traitors and rebels; Shi Miyuan (史彌遠), however, despite his involvement in the suicide of Emperor Ningzong of Song's eldest heir, does not feature in this section or indeed the entire History of Song. Famous general Wang Jianzai (王堅在), regardless of his valiant combat record, is also omitted as are many other individuals involved in Mongol defeats by the Song.

Despite both the History of Song and the History of Jin being completed at the same time they are different in many ways. the History of Song records Yue Fei emerging victorious from every battle with the Jin dynasty, (Note: However, the History of Jin refers on many occasions to defeats suffered by Yue Fei's army at the hands of the Jin, for example in Wang Bolong's (王伯龍) biography: "The soldiers crossed Caishi (採石) and defeated Yue Fei, Liu Li (劉立) and Lu Shang (路尚) amongst others, going on to capture a huge quantity of provisions." (軍渡採石，擊敗岳飛、劉立、路尚等兵，获芻糧數百萬計。). The biography of Wanyan Ang (完顔昂) records: "General Yue Fei, with a claimed force of millions of troops, came to attack Dongping (東平). There were five thousand soldiers stationed at Dongping who quickly counter attacked. Many flags were raised in the woods, giving the impression that there were troops hidden within then elite troops moved to the front. Yue Fei did not dare advance and withdrew after a stalemate lasting several days". (宋將岳飛以兵十萬，號稱百萬，來攻東平。東平有兵五千，倉卒出御之。時桑柘方茂，昂使多張旗幟於林間，以為疑兵，自以精兵陣於前。飛不敢動，相持數日而退。)) yet the History of Jin barely mentions Emperor Taizu of Jin's capture of Bozhou, Shunchangfu (順昌府), Ruzhou and Songzhou (嵩州) when Yue Fei and other commanders withdrew from the battle. Information in the History of Song regarding Yue Fei all comes from a work by his descendant Yue Ke's (岳珂) Eguo Jintuo Zuibian (鄂國金佗稡編, literally: 'Record of the Jin in Hubei'), the reliability of which is questioned by some sources, for example whether the Battle of Yancheng (郾城之戰) really was a great victory for the Song (Note: Yue Fei's biography in the History of Song quotes Yue Ke's version of events from his Ewang Xingshi Biannian (《鄂王行實編年》) regarding the "slaughter of the 5,000 enemy ". Chinese historian Deng Guangming (鄧廣銘) in his Biography of Yue Fei (《岳飛傳》) claims that at the Battle of Yinchang (潁昌決戰), which took place at modern day Xuchang City in Henan Province, only 500 of the enemy were killed. Another historian, Wang Cengyu (王曾瑜) supports the idea of 5,000 deaths given that in such a fierce battle it would be impossible for casualties to number only 500. Wang Cengyu further argues in section three of chapter nine of his Yue Fei and the Early Southern Song – Politics & the Military (《岳飛和南宋前期政治與軍事研究》) that the Battle of Yancheng (郾城之戰) was a decisive victory for the Song. On the other hand Wang also points out that even before he received the order from Emperor Gaozong of Song, Yue Fei had already withdrawn his troops from the battle.) and if the claim regarding Yue Fei's twelve gold medals is true. (Note: Hangzhou and Yancheng are separated by a distance of more than two thousand Chinese miles. Even a forced march would require a period of eight days to travel from one to the other but both Deng Guoming and Wang Cengyu believe that this was possible (see referenced works above.)) Furthermore, there remains the issue of whether Yu Fei's troops left the people unharmed as is sometimes claimed. (Note: The Sanchao Beimeng Huibian (《三朝北盟會編》) notes: When Han Shunfu (韓順夫) attacked Caocheng (曹成) he "often pitched camp, removed his armour and consorted with captive local women". After Han's defeat, Yue Fei was furious and had his soldiers murder all of Han's relatives.) Qing dynasty poet and historian Zhao Yi (趙翼) covers this in his Twenty-two Historical Sketches (《二十二史劄記》) under a section regarding observations on the Song and Jin armies (宋金用兵需參觀二史).

Because the History of Song was prepared in a hurry and was the work of many editors, it contains a number of unavoidable errors and contradictions; for example, an individual with two biographical entries is Li Xijing (李熙靖), who appears in chapter 116 of the historical biographies section then again in chapter 222. The work also covers the Northern and Early Southern Song Dynasties in detail with only an outline of the later Southern Song dynasty. There are more biographies of individuals from the Northern Song period, for example the Wenyuan Zhuan (文苑傳) covers a total of 96 people of which only 11 are from the Southern Song era. The History of Song is also considered the most disordered of the 24 Dynastic Histories. Zhao Yi comments: "When the Yuan dynasty wrote the history of the overthrown Song they probably just arranged preexisting Song texts." The Qing dynasty Siku Quanshu (《四庫全書總目》) collection of books says that the "main purpose of the History of Song is as a tribute to the Song emperors and their Confucianism. Attention is not paid to other matters so there are a great number of errors". In 1977, Zhonghua Publishing issued a new version of the History of Song with corrections to the punctuation.

== Later influence ==
Since the time of its publication, successive dynasties have produced commentaries on the History of Song. In 1546, Ming dynasty author Wang Zhu (王洙) completed his 100 chapter Supplement to the History of Song to be followed in 1561 by Ke Weiqi's (柯維祺) 200 chapter Songshi Xinbian (宋史新編) and the 250 chapter Songshi Ji (宋史記) written by Wang Weijian (王惟儉).

During the Qing dynasty, Chen Huangzhong (陳黃中) wrote the Songshi Gao (宋史稿) running to 219 chapters. Chen Xinyuan (陸心源) produced the 40 chapter Songshi Yi (宋史翼).

In Korea, Jeongjo of Joseon wrote the Songshi Qian (宋史筌) with 148 chapters. All these works correct some of the shortcomings of the History of Song but are no substitute for the original.

During the final years of the Qing Qianlong Emperor (r. 1735–1796 CE), historian Shao Jinhan (邵晉涵) along with Qian Daxin (錢大昕) and Zhang Xuecheng (章學誠) worked to revamp the History of Song. Shao produced his Biographical sketch of the Southern Song (南都事略), then went back to work on the History of Song but died before it was completed.

== See also ==
- History of the Song dynasty
