= Wushu =

Wushu may refer to:

== Martial arts ==
- Chinese martial arts, the various martial arts of China
- Wushu (sport), a modern exhibition of traditional Chinese martial arts
- Wushu stances, five key stances utilized in both contemporary wushu and traditional wushu

== Other topics ==
- Chinese shamanism (巫术; 巫術; wūshù)
- Wushu Township, Wan'an County, Jiangxi, China
- Countless (无数; wúshù), 2022 Mandopop album by Joker Xue
- Run and Kill (烏鼠; wū shŭ), 1993 Hong Kong film
- "Five Rats" (五鼠; wŭshŭ), major characters in the Chinese novel The Seven Heroes and Five Gallants

== See also ==
- Wuzhu (died 1148), prince and general of the Jin dynasty
- Age of Wushu, a 2012 free-to-play 3D martial arts video game
- Wu shu (historical text)
- Wushu in Singapore
