= 武術 =

武術 or 武术 means martial arts in East Asian languages, and may refer to:

- Bujutsu, meaning Japanese martial arts
- Musul, meaning Korean martial arts
- Võ thuật, meaning Vietnamese martial arts
- Wushu (term), meaning Chinese martial arts
  - Wushu (sport), an exhibition and a full-contact sport derived from traditional Chinese martial arts

== See also ==
- Wushu (disambiguation)
