= Chronicles of the Clans of Wei =

4th-century Chinese history book by Sun Sheng

The Chronicles of the Clans of Wei (Chinese: 魏氏春秋; pinyin: Weìshì Chūnqiū) was a Chinese history text on the Cao Wei dynasty, written by Sun Sheng of the Eastern Jin dynasty in the 4th century.

Its content survives only in the annotations in other books. For example, the Chronicles of the Clans of Wei was referenced by Pei Songzhi in his annotation of the Records of the Three Kingdoms by Chen Shou.
