= Jiang Shiquan =

Chinese poet

Shiquan Jiang
- 蔣士銓
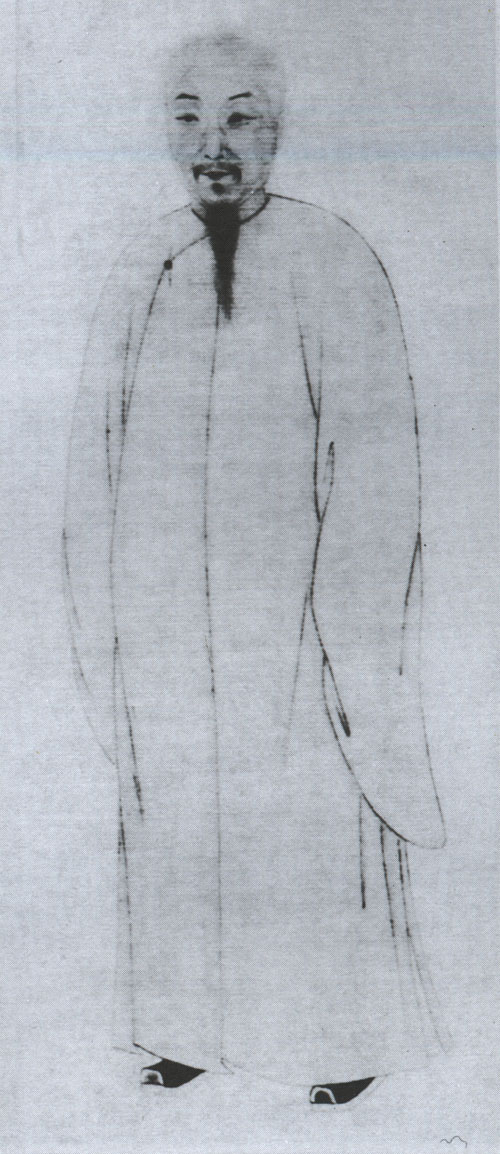
- Shiquan Jiang
- Born: December 1, 1725; Yanshan County, Jiangxi, China
- Died: April 3, 1784 (aged 58); Nanchang, Jiangxi, China
- Occupation: Poet

Chinese name
- Traditional Chinese: 蔣士銓
- Simplified Chinese: 蒋士铨
Transcriptions
Standard Mandarin
- Hanyu Pinyin: Jiǎng Shìquán

Xinyu
- Chinese: 心馀
Transcriptions
Standard Mandarin
- Hanyu Pinyin: Xīnyú

Shaosheng
- Chinese: 苕生
Transcriptions
Standard Mandarin
- Hanyu Pinyin: Sháoshēng

Qusheng
- Chinese: 蕖生
Transcriptions
Standard Mandarin
- Hanyu Pinyin: Qúshēng

Cangyuan
- Traditional Chinese: 藏園
- Simplified Chinese: 藏园
Transcriptions
Standard Mandarin
- Hanyu Pinyin: Cángyuán

Qingrong Jushi
- Chinese: 清容居士
- Literal meaning: See Householder
Transcriptions
Standard Mandarin
- Hanyu Pinyin: Qīngróng Jūshì

Jiang Shiquan (simplified Chinese: 蒋士铨; traditional Chinese: 蔣士銓; December 1, 1725–April 3, 1784) was a Chinese poet of the Qing dynasty. He was active during the Qianlong and Jiaqing eras of the Qing dynasty, and was classed as one of the "Three Great Masters of the Qianlong Era" (乾隆三大家) along with Yuan Mei and Zhao Yi. Jiang stated that he learned from Li Shangyin when he was 15, turned to study Du Fu and Han Yu when he was 19, and studied Su Shi and Huang Tingjian at the age of 40, and abandoned the style of the ancient authors to write his own poets. He was against the restorative trend of the "Former and Latter Seven Masters" (前后七子), and disagreed with the poetry theories of Weng Fanggang and Shen Deqian. He claimed to absorb both the styles of Tang and Song. But his comprehension of "Xingling" (性灵) was different from that of Yuan Mei.

Today we know about 2500 of his poems. Jiang also wrote Ci and proses. He was also an important playwright, leaving us 16 plays.
