= Du Ji =

Cao Wei state official (died 224)

- 杜畿

Supervisor of the Masters of Writing (尚書僕射)
- In office 222 – 224
- Monarch: Cao Pi

Colonel-Director of Retainers (司隸校尉)
- In office 220 – 222
- Monarch: Cao Pi

Administrator of Hedong (河東太守)
- In office 205 – 220
- Monarch: Emperor Xian of Han
- Chancellor: Cao Cao (from 208)
- Succeeded by: Zhao Yan

Administrator of Xiping (西平太守)
- In office ? – 205
- Monarch: Emperor Xian of Han

Personal details
- Born: 163 Xi'an, Shaanxi
- Died: 224 (Note: According to the chronology in Du Ji's biography in the Records of the Three Kingdoms, he died after Cao Pi went to Xuchang following his return to Luoyang after his first assault on Eastern Wu (Records of the Three Kingdoms, 16.497). Cao Pi attacked Wu in the winter of 222 and returned to Luoyang in the late spring of 224 (Records of the Three Kingdoms, 2.82, 84). In the autumn he went to Xuchang, and constructed a navy the following month. Since Du Ji died in a boating accident during the construction of a navy, it was probably in mid-autumn 224. In autumn 222, Du Ji was ordered to open the imperial granaries to alleviate a famine in Ji Province. In winter 224, Ji Province experienced another famine, but an unnamed official was tasked with issuing grain (2.80, 84). Du Ji certainly predeceased Cao Pi, who eulogised him (16.497).) Tao River, Henan/Shanxi
- Children: Du Shu; Du Li; Du Kuan
- Parent: Du Chong (father)
- Occupation: Official
- Courtesy name: Bohou (伯侯)
- Posthumous name: Marquis Dai (戴侯)
- Peerage: Marquis of Fengle Village (豐樂亭侯)

Du Ji (163 – 224), courtesy name Bohou, was an official who lived in the late Eastern Han dynasty of China. He later served as a high-ranking official in the state of Cao Wei during the Three Kingdoms period. He had the reputation of being a model governor, valiant, loyal and wise. He was the grandfather of Du Yu, the author of the most influential Zuo Zhuan commentary, who gave the work its modern form.

== Early career ==
Du Ji was from Duling County (杜陵縣), Jingzhao Commandery (京兆郡), which is in present-day southeastern Xi'an, Shaanxi. When he was 19, he served in the convict labour section under the magistrate of Zheng County (鄭縣; present-day Hua County, Shaanxi). He personally saw all of the hundreds of convicts in the county prisons, weighed the severity of their transgressions, and despatched them to their labours accordingly. Following this, he was nominated as a xiaolian and appointed as a fucheng (府丞; an aide) in the Hanzhong stores office.

Towards the end of the Han dynasty, Du Ji abandoned his post and fled south to Jing Province (covering present-day Hubei and Hunan). He returned to the north sometime between 196 and 205, (Note: Du Ji's biography states he returned from Jing Province in the Jian'an period (196–220), after which he dealt with insurrectionists associated with Gao Gan, whose rebellion against Cao Cao began in 205. See Records of the Three Kingdoms, 16.494.) and was recommended to Cao Cao by Xun Yu. Du Ji was appointed as a Director of Justice (司直) to under the Minister of Works (then held by Cao Cao), then sent west to Xiping Commandery (西平郡; present-day Xining, Qinghai) to serve as the commandery's Administrator (太守) and as Colonel Who Protects the Qiang (護羌校尉).

In 205, Gao Gan, a northern warlord and adopted nephew of Yuan Shao, rebelled against Cao Cao, to whom he had surrendered years earlier. Gao Gan convinced Wang Yi (王邑), the Administrator of Hedong Commandery (河東郡), to join him in the rebellion. Two other men from Hedong Commandery, Wei Gu (衛固) and Fan Xian (范先), claimed to have liberated cities for Cao Cao, while conspiring with Gao Gan.

The loss of Hedong Commandery greatly troubled Cao Cao, who saw its strategic location as critical to controlling China, and worried that the rebels could cause serious harm if they were to ally with Liu Biao, the Governor of Jing Province, to their south. He asked Xun Yu to recommend him a great general the likes of Xiao He or Kou Xun (寇恂), who substantially assisted the careers of the Han dynasty emperors Gaozu and Guangwu respectively. Xun Yu cautiously recommended Du Ji.

== As the Administrator of Hedong Commandery ==
Cao Cao appointed Du Ji as the Administrator of Hedong Commandery, so Wei Gu and Fan Xian sent several thousand soldiers to close the ford of Shanjin (陝津; northeast of present-day Sanmenxia, Henan), one of the three major fords across the Yellow River, and only route into Hedong from an area still under Cao Cao's control. Du Ji was unable to cross the river, so Cao Cao sent a large force under Xiahou Dun to attack the rebel forces.

Rather than waiting for Xiahou Dun's forces to crush the Hedong rebels, Du Ji chose to use subterfuge. At a smaller ford, he crossed the river alone, and granted Wei Gu and Fan Xian high military commands and civil offices in Hedong Commandery's administration. He proceeded to convince them that they had to move slowly in order to win over the people of Hedong, so they kept their forces in check for several weeks. Afterwards, Du Ji proposed that the generals, aides and clerks be permitted to visit their homes to see their families, and Wei Gu and Fan Xian allowed this, for fear of alienating the populace.

Thus the rebel forces in Hedong lacked all middle and lower management, and Wei Gu and Fan Xian stayed put, training their troops while rebellion spread in adjacent commanderies. Having hollowed out the effectiveness of the rebel army from inside, Du Ji took his leave, accompanied by a few dozen horsemen. In a few weeks' time, he had mustered a force of over four thousand. Wei Gu's forces, along with Gao Gan and Zhang Sheng (張晟), attacked Du Ji but could not dislodge him.

When Xiahou Dun's army arrived, Gao Gan and Zhang Sheng fled, while Wei Gu and Fan Xian were executed. Du Ji pardoned their assistants and conspirators, and sent them back to their old occupations. Thus it was that in the chaotic collapse of the Han dynasty, Hedong was one of the first commanderies stabilised under Cao Cao's rule, and with the least wasted effort and resources.

As the commandery's Administrator, Du Ji promoted lenience and mercy, and aided the populace by exerting as little control over them as possible. When someone impeached him or spoke out against him, Du Ji would have the person summoned and explain to them his plans, with the command to think them over thoroughly. If there was something the person still did not understand, Du Ji would summon them again to explain more clearly. The local elders were greatly amenable to this policy, and quickly accepted Du Ji as a model governor. He would exempt particularly filial sons and dutiful wives from state labour, and taught improved farming methods to increase harvests. This achieved, he began teaching martial arts in the winters, and had the people keep their weaponry in good order. He opened a school where he personally taught from the Chinese classics.

In 211, Han Sui and Ma Chao drew up armies against Cao Cao in response to a suspected invasion of their lands. Cities throughout Hongnong and Fengyi commanderies rose in support, while Hedong Commandery remained firmly loyal, despite adjacency to the rebels. When Cao Cao marched west to confront them, his army was fed entirely by grain from Hedong, and after defeating Han Sui and Ma Chao there were still in excess of 4,000 hectolitres of grain left over. Cao Cao increased Du Ji's salary after this.

When Cao Cao was enfeoffed as the Duke of Wei by Emperor Xian in 213, he appointed Du Ji as a Master of Writing (尚書). Two years later, Cao Cao invaded Hanzhong Commandery and Du Ji sent 5,000 men to join Cao Cao's army in the campaign. According to the Records of the Three Kingdoms, his soldiers were so loyal that not a single person from the Hedong battalion fled from combat. Cao Cao again compared Du Ji to Xiao He and Kou Xun, and said Hedong was like a limb to him.

Throughout the 16 years Du Ji governed Hedong Commandery, it was the most stable among all the commanderies in China at the time.

== Service under Cao Pi ==
In 220, after Cao Cao's death, his son and successor Cao Pi, summoned Du Ji to Luoyang to serve as a Master of Writing (尚書), in addition to enfeoffing him as a Secondary Marquis (關內侯). Later that year, Cao Pi usurped the throne from Emperor Xian and ended the Han dynasty, after which he declared himself emperor of the state of Wei. After ascending the throne, Cao Pi promoted Du Ji from a Secondary Marquis to a village marquis under the title "Marquis of Fengle Village" (豐樂亭侯), with a marquisate comprising 100 taxable households. More substantially, Du Ji was appointed Colonel-Director of Retainers (司隸校尉), the executive officer in charge of the area surrounding the imperial capital and one of the most powerful positions in the civil bureaucracy.

In 222, Cao Pi led the Wei armies to invade Wei's rival state, Eastern Wu, in 222. He also promoted Du Ji to the position of Supervisor of the Masters of Writing (尚書僕射), entrusting him with administrating state affairs during the expedition. Two years later, when Cao Pi travelled to Xuchang, he left matters in Luoyang in Du Ji's hands again.

In 224, Cao Pi ordered Du Ji to assist in building his fleet for attacking Eastern Wu. Du Ji was in charge of the imperial tower ship, the fleet's central flagship. While testing the ship on the Tao River (陶河), Du Ji's crew encountered heavy winds and the ship sank. Du Ji drowned in the river, died at the age of 62. (Note: Du Ji's place of death is not certain. The base text of Records of the Three Kingdoms, at 16.497, says he was testing the imperial tower ship in the Tao River when he drowned, then goes on to quote an elegy by Cao Pi saying Du Ji drowned at Meng Ford (孟津). The crossing of Meng Ford was on the Yellow River adjacent to present-day Mengjin County, northwest of Luoyang, where Du Ji was stationed during his late career. According to the Book of Wei, there was a Tao River in northern Xiuwu County, in present-day Jiaozuo, Henan, bordering Shanxi (Book of Wei, 106.2458). It is unclear what this waterway is named at present. The Tao River may refer to a Taoshui (陶水) mentioned in the Classic of Waterways, in Changzhi County, Changzhi, Shanxi (Annotated Classic of Waterways, 10.914). There is a tributary of the Zhang River there, the Taoqing River (陶清河), that appears to have preserved part of the ancient hydronym.) Cao Pi is said to have wept upon hearing news of Du Ji's death, and wrote that he "epitomised loyalty". Du Ji was posthumously granted the office of Minister Coachman (太僕), which his son Du Shu (杜恕) inherited.

== Historiography ==
The only surviving source for Du Ji's biographical information is the Records of the Three Kingdoms, in which his life history is related unusually hagiographically. Conversations with no possible recorders are presented, and Du Ji is portrayed as a perfect, sagely governor who taught his subjects industry, culture and loyalty to the death. This is perhaps one of the faults of the Records of the Three Kingdoms inherited from the Book of Wei, whose authors would have been sensitive to the fact that Du Ji's grandson was Emperor Wu's uncle. (Note: Du Yu married Princess Gaolu, a daughter of Sima Yi.) (Note: In his annotations to Zizhi Tongjian, Hu Sanxing wrote that given the Du clan's prominence in both Cao Wei and the Jin dynasty, it was expected that records on Du Ji's deeds would be exaggerated.)

== See also ==
- Lists of people of the Three Kingdoms

== Bibliography ==
- Chen Shou (1977) [429]. Pei Songzhi (ed.). Annotated Records of the Three Kingdoms 三國志注. Taipei: Dingwen Printing.
- de Crespigny, Rafe (2007). A biographical dictionary of Later Han to the Three Kingdoms (23–220 AD). Brill. ISBN 978-90-04-15605-0.
- Li Daoyuan (1900s) [500s]. Yang Shoujing (楊守敬); Xiong Huizhen (熊會貞); Yin Xizhong (殷熙仲); Chen Qiaoyi (陳橋驛) (eds.). Annotated Classic of Waterways (1989 ed.). Nanjing: Jiangsu Ancient Books Press.
- Loewe, Michael (1961). "The measurement of grain during the Han period". T'oung Pao. 49 (1/2). Leiden: Brill: 64–95. doi:10.1163/156853262X00020. JSTOR 4527501.
- Qu Lindong (瞿林东) (1999). Outline of Chinese Historiography 中国史学史纲. Beijing: Beijing Publishing. ISBN 9787200037210.
- Schaberg, David (2001). A Patterned Past: Form and Thought in Early Chinese Historiography. Cambridge, MA: Harvard University Press. ISBN 0674008618.
- Wei Shou (1974) [554]. Book of Wei 魏書. Beijing: Zhonghua Publishing.
