= Sima Biao =

Jin dynasty historian and noble

- Traditional Chinese: 司馬彪
- Simplified Chinese: 司马彪
Transcriptions
Standard Mandarin
- Hanyu Pinyin: Sīmǎ Biāo
- Wade–Giles: Ssu-ma Piao
Yue: Cantonese
- Yale Romanization: Sīmáh Bīu
- Jyutping: Si1 maa5 Biu1
- IPA: [si˥ ma˩˧ piw˥]

Sima Biao (Chinese: 司馬彪; between 238 and 246 (Note: His biography in Jin Shu states that at the time of his death, he was "sixty-something".) – 306? (Note: His biography in Jin Shu states that he died towards the end of the reign of Emperor Hui of Jin, without stating a specific year.)), style name Shaotong (紹統), was an historian and nobleman during the Jin dynasty of China.

== Biography ==
Born under Cao Wei, Sima Biao was the eldest son of Sima Mu (司馬睦), Prince of Gaoyang. His grandfather was Sima Jin (司馬進), younger brother of Sima Yi. This made Sima Biao one of many second-cousins to Emperor Wu of Jin, grandson of Sima Yi and founding emperor of the Jin dynasty. Although the eldest son, Sima Biao was disinherited by his father due to his love of leisure and sex, pushing him onto a scholarly career path.

Appointed to minor sinecures, he began to work on literature and history, annotating the Zhuangzi and the Huainanzi, and writing the Chronicles of the Nine States (九州春秋; Jiuzhou Chunqiu). Lamenting the absence of a coherent history of the Eastern Han, Sima Biao began collating various sources into what would become his greatest work, the Continuation of the Book of Han (續漢書), covering the two hundred years from Emperor Guangwu of Han to Emperor Xian of Han. He also edited Qiao Zhou's Examination of Ancient History (古史考), altering over two hundred events so they would comply with the Bamboo Annals.

== Works ==
Sima Biao's Continuation of the Book of Han was one of many attempts during the Jin dynasty to create a history of the Eastern Han. Like most traditional Chinese histories, his book was arranged into annals and biographies, along with eight treatises, and ran to a total length of 80 fascicles. Of these, all have been lost but the eight treatises or records (志), consisting of 30 volumes, on the topics of the calendar, ceremony, rituals, astronomy, the five phases, geography, bureaucracy, vehicles, and clothing. These have been incorporated into Fan Ye's Book of the Later Han by Liang dynasty scholar Liu Zhao, who wrote a preface to the incorporation/annotation. Sima Biao is thus sometimes credited as a co-author of that work.

== Titles and appointments held ==
- Commandant of Cavalry (騎都尉)
- Assistant in the Palace Library (秘書郎)
- Vice Director of the Palace Library (秘書丞)
- Gentleman Cavalier Attendant (散騎侍郎) (Note: This was an honorific title signifying the official as a favoured companion or adviser to the emperor. It was Emperor Hui of Jin who conferred this title.)

== Sources ==
- Fang Xuanling; et al., eds. (1974) [648]. "卷82, Biography of Sima Biao". Book of Jin 晉書 (in Chinese). Vol. 82. Beijing: Zhonghua Shuju. pp. 2142–2143.
- Durrant, Stephen (2001). "The literary features of historical writing". In Victor H. Mair (ed.). The Columbia History of Chinese Literature. New York: Columbia University Press. pp. 493–510. ISBN 9780231109840.

=== Further reading ===
- Beck, B.J. Mansvelt (2022) [1990]. The Treatises of Later Han: Their Author, Sources, Contents and Place in Chinese Historiography. Sinica Leidensia, Vol. 21. Brill. doi:10.1163/9789004482845. ISBN 978-90-04-48284-5.
