= Yuan Huan =

Early 3rd century Eastern Han dynasty official

- 袁渙

Grandee Secretary (御史大夫) (acting)
- In office 213 – ?
- Monarch: Emperor Xian of Han
- Chancellor: Cao Cao

Prefect of the Gentlemen of the Palace (郎中令)
- In office 213 – ?
- Monarch: Emperor Xian of Han
- Chancellor: Cao Cao

Personal details
- Born: Unknown Taikang County, Henan
- Died: Unknown
- Relations: Yuan Ba (袁霸; cousin); Yuan Hui (袁徽; cousin and younger brother of Yuan Ba); Yuan Min (袁敏; cousin and younger brother of Yuan Ba and Yuan Hui); Yuan Liang (袁亮; nephew and son of Yuan Ba)
- Children: Yuan Kan (袁侃); Yuan Yu (袁㝢); Yuan Ao (袁奥); Yuan Zhun (袁准)
- Parent: Yuan Pang (袁滂) (father)
- Occupation: Official
- Courtesy name: Yaoqing (曜卿)

Yuan Huan (fl. 190–210s), courtesy name Yaoqing, was an official who lived during the late Eastern Han dynasty of China. He was a son of Yuan Pang (袁滂), who served as Situ during the reign of Emperor Ling of Han.

During the 190s, he served under the warlords Liu Bei, Yuan Shu and Lü Bu. In particular, Liu Bei, as Inspector of Yu province, recommended him as a maocai. After the fall of Lü Bu in February 199, Yuan Huan joined Cao Cao as an adviser. He was involved in a number of policy decisions, including the administration of the tuntian policy. In the 210s, Yuan Huan was given the appointment of Prefect of the Gentlemen of the Palace (郎中令).

Yuan Huan died sometime before 220, and it is said Cao Cao wept for him. He left behind four sons, all of whom were known for their scholarly accomplishments. His descendants became one of the leading aristocratic families of the Jin dynasty and Southern dynasties.

== Descendants ==
Yuan Huan's son Yuan Zhun was the father of Yuan Chong (袁冲), father of Yuan Dan (袁耽). Yuan Dan had two younger sisters, Nühuang and Nüzheng, who married Yin Hao and Xie Shang respectively.

One of Yuan Huan's descendants was Jin official/historian Yuan Hong.

== See also ==
- Lists of people of the Three Kingdoms
