= Shen Jiaben =

Chinese scholar (1840–1913)

- 沈家本
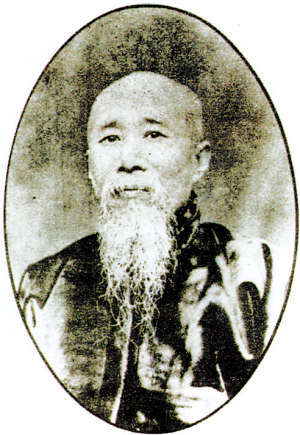

Minister of Justice
- In office 1911–1912
- Monarch: Xuantong Emperor
- Premier: Yuan Shikai

Personal details
- Born: 1840 Huzhou, Zhejiang, Qing dynasty
- Died: 1913 (aged 72–73) Republic of China
- Education: Imperial examination (jinshi degree, 1883)
- Occupation: Politician, jurist

Shen Jiaben (Chinese: 沈家本; pinyin: Shěn Jiāběn; Wade–Giles: Shen Chia-pen, 1840 – 1913), alias Jiyi (Chinese: 寄簃; pinyin: Jìyí; Wade–Giles: Chi-i), was a Late Qing Chinese politician and jurist from Huzhou, Zhejiang province.

Shen became a jinshi in 1883. He had been once the Prefect of Tianjin during 1893–7, then the Vice Minister of Justice. He was appointed to be the Secretary of Enactment (修訂法律大臣 or 修律大臣) together with Wu Tingfang. He requested the throne to reorganize the Codification Office into the Enactment Office. He led the translations of foreign laws there after it was ratified.

Shen and Wu were in charge of the 1905 revision of the Qing Code, abolishing several cruel means of punishment such as "slow slicing" (lingchi). Besides, they established Imperial Law College (京師法律學堂) in 1906.

Shen served as the Minister of Justice during 1911–12, in the cabinet of Yuan Shikai.

The first part of his Posthumous Works of Mr. Shen Jiyi [沈寄簃先生遺書] is deemed to be a monograph of great importance on the history of Chinese law.

== Cited works ==
- Li, Guilian (2000). 沈家本传 [A Biography of Shen Jiaben] (in Chinese). Law Press (China). ISBN 978-7-503-62984-6.
