= Wushu in Singapore =

Wushu is a successful industry in Singapore, with successful practitioners of the sport emerging from the country. Wushu was already gaining prominence in Singapore in as early as 1967. The country was hailed as Southeast Asia's "best wushu nation" in 1993. In 2000, the Government in Singapore initiated wushu into its Sports Excellence Scheme.

As of 2013, Singapore won two gold medals, three silver medals, and seven bronze medals at the World Wushu Championships, placing it at number 20 in the world. The Singapore Wushu Dragon and Lion Dance Federation, formerly known as the Singapore National Pugilistic Federation, is the official body which oversees and governs the sport in Singapore. Among the notable wushu professionals in the city-state is Vincent Ng, who became the first individual wushu champion from Singapore in 1995.

== History ==
In 1993, Singapore was ranked the number one wushu nation within Southeast Asia. The same year, Tan Mui Buay, a taijiquan exponent, snagged the gold medal at the SEA Games held in Singapore, and followed up this feat by finishing third and obtaining the country's first medal at the 1994 Asian Games in Hiroshima, Japan. The Singapore Sports Council recognised Tan's achievements by rating her as an elite-class athlete. She also won a place in the Singapore Book of Records for her showing in Hiroshima.

The 1995 World Wushu Championships held in the United States saw Vincent Ng, who participated in the broadsword category, earning the country its first gold medal at the event. This feat was unparalleled for more than a decade, until in November 2013 when Ho Lin Ying became the second Singaporean individual wushu world champion. In 1999, he was listed as one of the twentieth-century's fifty best athletes by newspaper The Straits Times. In 2015, Tan Xiang Tian became Singapore third world wushu champion after winning xingyiquan at the 2015 World Wushu Championships in Jakarta, Indonesia.

The renowned Wing Chun master Ip Man, imparted his knowledge of the sport to disciples Lee Shing and Wong Shun Leung. Joseph Cheng and Nino Bernardo became proteges of Lee and Wong respectively, and they in turn became Singaporean Chua Kah Joo's teachers, making Chua a third-generation Yip Man disciple. Later in his life, Chua set up various wushu academies in the United Kingdom and one in his home country, also coaching a healthy number of students. Similarly, there are a handful of third or fourth-generation proteges of another wushu great, Wong Fei-hung, in Singapore. They include Leong Kwok Khuen and Siew Puay Lee.

== Governing body and other organisations ==
The official national governing body of wushu in Singapore is the Singapore Wushu Dragon and Lion Dance Federation, interchangeably known as the Singapore National Federation of Wushu. It was established on February 3, 1967, as the Singapore National Pugilistic Federation.

There are numerous wushu schools in Singapore. Wufang Singapore is known to have produced multiple SEA games gold medalists like Jowen Lim who was also the 2012 and 2014 world junior champion. There are other Wushu schools like Xuan Sports, RexArts, and Chua Kah Joo's Wing Chun Kuen Training Centre, as well as, Leo Wen Yeow's Martial House, which bills itself as the leading wushu institute in Singapore. Under Martial House is the Dewu Pugilistic Association, headed by the former association's Master Leo Kee Ann.
