= Cang Ci =

Early 3rd century Cao Wei official

- 倉慈

Administrator of Dunhuang (敦煌太守)
- In office c. 227 – c. 230s
- Monarch: Cao Rui

Prefect of Chang'an (長安令)
- In office c. 225 – c. 226
- Monarch: Cao Pi

Personal details
- Born: Unknown; Anhui
- Died: Unknown; Dunhuang, Gansu
- Occupation: Official
- Courtesy name: Xiaoren (孝仁)

Cang Ci (fl. 190s–230s), courtesy name Xiaoren, was an official in the state of Cao Wei during the Three Kingdoms period of China.

== Early career ==
Cang Ci was born in the late Eastern Han dynasty and was from Huainan (淮南; covering roughly present-day Anhui). He started his career as a minor official in a commandery. During the mid Jian'an era (196–220) in the reign of Emperor Xian, Cang Ci was appointed as a Commandant of Pacification and Collection (綏集都尉) to oversee the tuntian system in Huainan.

After the end of the Han dynasty in 220, Cang Ci served as an official in the state of Cao Wei. He served as the Prefect of Chang'an (長安令) in the final years of Cao Pi's reign (220–226) and was known for being fair and just. He was respected and admired by other officials and the common people.

== Governorship of Dunhuang ==
During the Taihe era (227–233) in Cao Rui's reign, Cang Ci was appointed as the Administrator (太守) of Dunhuang Commandery, which was located in the remote regions in western China. Owing to the tremendous disturbances in the core areas of China during that period, Dunhuang had been in a semi-anarchic state for about 20 years – it had no Administrator and its local government was weak, while influential landlords abused their power to oppress the peasantry. The previous Administrators such as Yin Feng (尹奉) and others had allowed Dunhuang to remain in its sorry state and had not made any improvements.

When Cang Ci arrived in Dunhuang, he sought to reform the local government, clamp down on the power of the landlords, and help the poor. He initiated a vigorous programme of land redistribution by seizing excess plots of land from the landlords and giving them to peasants who had no land. He saw that many criminal cases had piled up over the years because the magistrates were unable to pass any judgment and that the prisons were packed. Cang Ci personally handled the cases which had not been reviewed for years. In order to spare petty criminals from being subjected to indefinite detention, he meted out flogging as a punishment to criminals who committed non-capital crimes and released them. His efforts revealed that less than ten crimes a year actually warranted the death penalty in Dunhuang.

As Dunhuang was located near foreign lands, many traders often travelled from the west to China through the Silk Road to pay tribute or to trade. However, many wealthy locals in Dunhuang objected to trading and had even cheated foreign traders, resulting in much unhappiness among foreigners. When Cang Ci heard about this, he personally went to reassure the foreign traders and opened up special routes leading to Luoyang exclusively for those traders, while ordering his men to protect and escort the traders as they passed through. The foreigners were very grateful to Cang Ci.

== Death ==
Cang Ci died in office after serving for many years in Dunhuang. The people in Dunhuang deeply mourned his death as if they had lost one of their loved ones, and they even drew portraits of Cang Ci to commemorate him. When the foreign traders learnt of Cang Ci's death, they gathered outside government offices to mourn him, while some even offered blood sacrifices. Temples and shrines were also built to commemorate him.

== Appraisal ==
Chen Shou, who wrote Cang Ci's biography in the Sanguozhi, commented on Cang Ci as follows: "Zheng Hun and Cang Ci are capable governors. They are among the most famous governors in Wei at the time!"

== See also ==
- Lists of people of the Three Kingdoms
