= Book of Wu =

Lost history of Eastern Wu (c. 250)

The Book of Wu or Wu shu (Chinese: 吳書) is a lost history of the state of Eastern Wu (229–280). It was compiled by the official historians of the Wu court under orders from the Wu emperors. Portions of the text survive only as quotations preserved in later texts, especially Pei Songzhi's Annotated Records of the Three Kingdoms.

Emperor Sun Quan (r. 229–252) likely commissioned the work c. 250, with Ding Fu and Xiang Jun as compilers. A new committee was formed several years later at the beginning of Sun Liang's reign (r. 252–258) to replace Ding and Xiang, likely due to court factionalism—consisting of Wei Zhao, Zhou Zhao, Xue Ying, Liang Guang, and Hua He. The second committee faced difficulties due to the deaths of several of its members, as Zhou Zhao and Liang Guang died within 20 years of the committee's creation and Wei Zhao and Hua He died soon after. The last surviving member of the committee, Xue Ying, lived through the fall of Wu and died in 282. The book was probably not completed, and it was lost sometime after the Tang dynasty (618–907).

== Compilation ==
The Book of Wu was first commissioned by the first Wu emperor Sun Quan probably c. 250. The main primary source on the Book of Wu is a memorial written by Hua He submitted to the last Wu emperor Sun Hao c. 273, quoted in the Records of the Three Kingdoms' biography of Xue Ying. According to this memorial, around the end of his reign, Sun Quan ordered the Court Historian Ding Fu and the Palace Gentleman Xiang Jun to compile the Book of Wu.

In 252, at the start of Sun Liang's reign, another compilation committee replaced Ding Fu and Xiang Jun at the suggestion of regent Zhuge Ke. It consisted of Wei Zhao, Zhou Zhao, Xue Ying, Liang Guang, and Hua He himself, with Wei Zhao and Xue Ying leading the committee. In his memorial, Hua He states that the change of committee was due to Ding Fu and Xiang Jun being incapable of completing the work. However, Australian historian Rafe de Crespigny argues that it likely that the change of committee was caused by political factionalism, as Ding Fu was learned enough to have compiled the Hanguan yishe xuanyong, a study of the official selection system of the Han, and the Han yi, a study of the rituals of the Han. Chinese historian Zhang Zixia further notes that those two works by Ding Fu, as well as the Shixue pian by Xiang Jun, were frequently referenced in later works, including the Chuxue ji and the annotations to the Book of Han and Book of Later Han. De Crespigny also notes that when Zhuge Ke came to power at the end of the reign of Sun Quan he pushed liberal and reformist policies, which further suggests a political component to the change of committee.

The new committee faced difficulty in compiling the work due to external factors, including the deaths of several of its members. Zhou Zhao and Liang Guang died within 20 years of the second committee's creation. Zhou Zhao was sent to prison sometime during the reign of Sun Xiu, and although Hua He petitioned the emperor on his behalf, he was executed. No more details about Liang Guang's death are recorded.

Wei Zhao was executed and his family exiled to Lingling Commandery, despite pleas by Hua He. He had angered the last Wu emperor Sun Hao by refusing to write a chapter of annals for Sun Hao's father Sun He, whom he had canonized as an emperor posthumously; and refusing a ceremonial toast at a banquet, citing health reasons, as he was trying to retire from the court due to old age.

Xue Ying had once commanded a garrison at Wuchang, but around 273, he was exiled to the far south for involvement in a mistaken strategy, soon after Wei Zhao's disgrace. Hua He pleaded to the emperor on his behalf, and in his memorial concerning the history project he wrote that Xue Ying was one of the few men who could assist in his work. This time, his words were acted upon and Xue Ying was recalled to the capital and made State Historian on the Left. However, the project did not advance much more as only two years later in 275 Hua He himself was dismissed for a minor offense and died at home a year later. Xue Ying had also been exiled to the far south a second time. He was later recalled again, but his chief service during his time as a minister was to write the Wu's surrender document to the Jin dynasty. Xue Ying served the Jin court for a short time before dying in 282.

=== Involvement of Zhou Chu ===
Zhou Chu was a Western Jin dynasty official and general—the Records of the Three Kingdoms biography of his father, Zhou Fang states that like his father, Chu possessed both literary and military skills. His biography in the Book of Jin states that "Zhou Chu authored the Moyu in 30 chapters and the Fengtu ji, and also compiled the Book of Wu." However, the Records of the Three Kingdoms and Pei's annotations both make no mention of Zhou Chu ever compiling a Book of Wu.

According to Zhang Zixia, there are two possible explanations for this: either Zhou Chu compiled his own Book of Wu after the founding of the Jin dynasty, or he participated in the official historiographical effort under the late Eastern Wu. If Zhou Chu had compiled his own text, separate from the efforts of Wei Zhao, Xue Ying, and others, it probably would have been an important source about the Eastern Wu for later historians. However, there is no mention of such a text in Pei's Annotated Records of the Three Kingdoms nor in the bibliographies of the Book of Sui' and the Old and New Books of Tang, which Zhang finds difficult to accept.

Zhang finds the second explanation more likely. The Records of the Three Kingdoms of Zhou's father states that Zhou Chu attained the post of Dongguan ling (东观令) during the era of Tianji (277–280), while his biography in the Book of Jin states that he was a Dongguan zuocheng (东观左丞) under the Wu. Both were connected to the compilation of history. For instance, Hua He served as Dongguan ling and State Historian on the Right while participating in the compilation of the Wu shu. Likewise, Zhou Chu, as either Dongguan ling or Dongguan zuocheng during the final years of Sun Hao's reign, may likewise have worked with Xue Ying during the final phase of the Wu shu's compilation.

== Content ==
The Book of Sui (completed 636 CE) records a copy of the Book of Wu containing 25 chapters out of an original 55, though it also states that the text was extant in complete form during the Liang dynasty. The bibliographies of the Old Book of Tang (completed 945 CE) and the New Book of Tang (completed 1060 CE) record a copy of the book containing the complete 55 chapters. The Book of Wu was later lost.

The only substantial portion of the Book of Wu's text that remains is the quotations in Pei Songzhi's Annotated Records of the Three Kingdoms, along with the likely inclusion of large amounts of uncredited text included in Chen's Records of the Three Kingdoms.

Pei's quotations of the Book of Wu contain indications of the book's original contents. The Book of Wu is quoted in the biographies of Cao Cao and Dong Zhuo, indicating that the book covered the career of Sun Jian during the final years of the Han dynasty. However, in the annals of the three Wu emperors after Sun Quan, the Book of Wu is only quoted once by Pei, and the quotation is rather irrelevant. The Records of the Three Kingdoms biographies of people involved with the final years of the Wu are also rather lacking. This suggests that the book was never completed, although this could also mean that Chen Shou had fully incorporated its material into the main Records of the Three Kingdoms text.

Pei's quotations of the Book of Wu present an important Wu perspective on events that otherwise would have been missing. For example, the first time Pei cites the Book of Wu is in the biography of Cao Cao, which states that Cao Song was killed by Tao Qian, while the Book of Wu quotation states that it was one of Tao's subordinates who killed Cao Song, and that Cao Cao unjustly blamed the murder on Tao.

The other two of the Three Kingdoms also compiled their own official histories: Cao Wei with the Book of Wei and Shu Han with a Book of Shu (蜀書). The official histories of all three kingdoms were written to follow the pattern of the Dongguan Hanji, which was compiled by several generations of official historians during the Eastern Han.

=== Lack of biography of Sun Shao ===
Yu Xi, the author of the Zhi lin, quoted in Pei Songzhi's Annotated Records of the Three Kingdoms within the annals of Sun Quan, wrote that he was surprised that the Records of the Three Kingdoms did not include a biography of Sun Shao, an important politician and the first chancellor of Wu, so he asked the learned scholar Liu Shengshu for his opinion. Liu Shengshu claimed that Ding Fu and Xiang Jun's work contained a biography of Sun Shao, but since the later compiler Wei Zhao sided with Sun Shao's political opponent Zhang Wen, it was excluded from the later text. According to Xiaofei Tian, this seems to imply that Ding and Xiang's drafts survived independently into the fourth century. De Crespigny states that this explanation is plausible, and notes that similar omissions are found in other histories.

== Bibliography ==
- Compiled by Chen Shou, with annotations compiled by Pei Songzhi. Sanguozhi 三國志 [Records of the Three Kingdoms] (in Chinese).
- de Crespigny, Rafe (2018). Generals of the South: The Foundation and Early History of the Three Kingdoms State of Wu (PDF) (Internet ed.). Australian National University.
- Compiled by Liu Zhiji. Shitong 史通 (in Chinese).
- Tian, Xiaofei (2016). "Remaking History: The Shu and Wu Perspectives in the Three Kingdoms Period". Journal of the American Oriental Society. 136 (4): 705–731. doi:10.7817/jameroriesoci.136.4.0705.
- Compiled by Wei Zheng and several others. Suishu 隋書 [Book of Sui] (in Chinese).
- Zhang, Zixia (2008). "《吴书》作者考辨" [On the Authorship of the Book of Wu]. Journal of Historiography (in Chinese). 130 (2): 110–113.
