= Gan Bao =

Chinese historian and writer (died 336)

Gan Bao (or Kan Pao) (Chinese: 干寶, pronounced [kân.pàu]) (fl. 315, died March or April 336), courtesy name Lingsheng (令升), was a Chinese historian and writer at the court of Emperor Yuan of Jin.

== Background and life ==
Gan Bao was a native of Xincai County, in southern Henan. His grandfather Gan Tong was a general under Eastern Wu. Gan diligently studied the classics during his childhood and youth.

Gan Bao was appointed head of Office of History at the court of Emperor Yuan of Jin, after the minister Wang Dao noticed that the position of court historian was empty, and recommended Gan for the position. Gan later demonstrated his skills in his Jinji (晉紀), presumably a written account of earlier court activities.

== Soushen Ji ==
Gan Bao subsequently occupied other prominent positions at the court, but today he is best remembered for the book Soushen Ji, which he probably compiled. An extremely important early example of the Zhiguai genre, the book comprises several hundred short stories and witness reports about spirits and supernatural events. The author said his goal in compiling the book was to "show clearly that the spirit world is no lie."

Gan Bao's biography in Book of Jin recorded that Gan Bao's father had an affair with a maid. Out of jealousy, after his father died, his mother entombed the maid together with his father's remains. Due to their young age, Gan Bao and his elder brother did not know of this incident. After their mother died more than 10 years later, their father's tomb was opened (presumably to inter their mother together with her late husband). Gan Bao's family found the maid lying on the father's coffin as though she was alive. The maid was taken back to the Gan household, and regained consciousness after a few days. She explained that she survived more than 10 years sealed inside the tomb with the help of the father's ghost, which brought her food and water. The father's ghost also treated her in the same loving way as he did while he was alive. The family confirmed the maid's account by summoning the father's ghost in a ritual. Gan Bao eventually married the maid and had a son with her.

In another incident, Gan Bao's elder brother fell gravely ill and stopped breathing. Yet, his body did not turn cold even after several days. Later, the elder brother regained consciousnesses and commented that events in the supernatural world felt like dreams to him; he did not even realise that he had lost consciousness. His curiosity sparked by these two incidents, Gan Bao then began collecting short stories and witness reports about spirits and supernatural events.
