= Sun Chuo =

4th century Eastern Jin official and poet

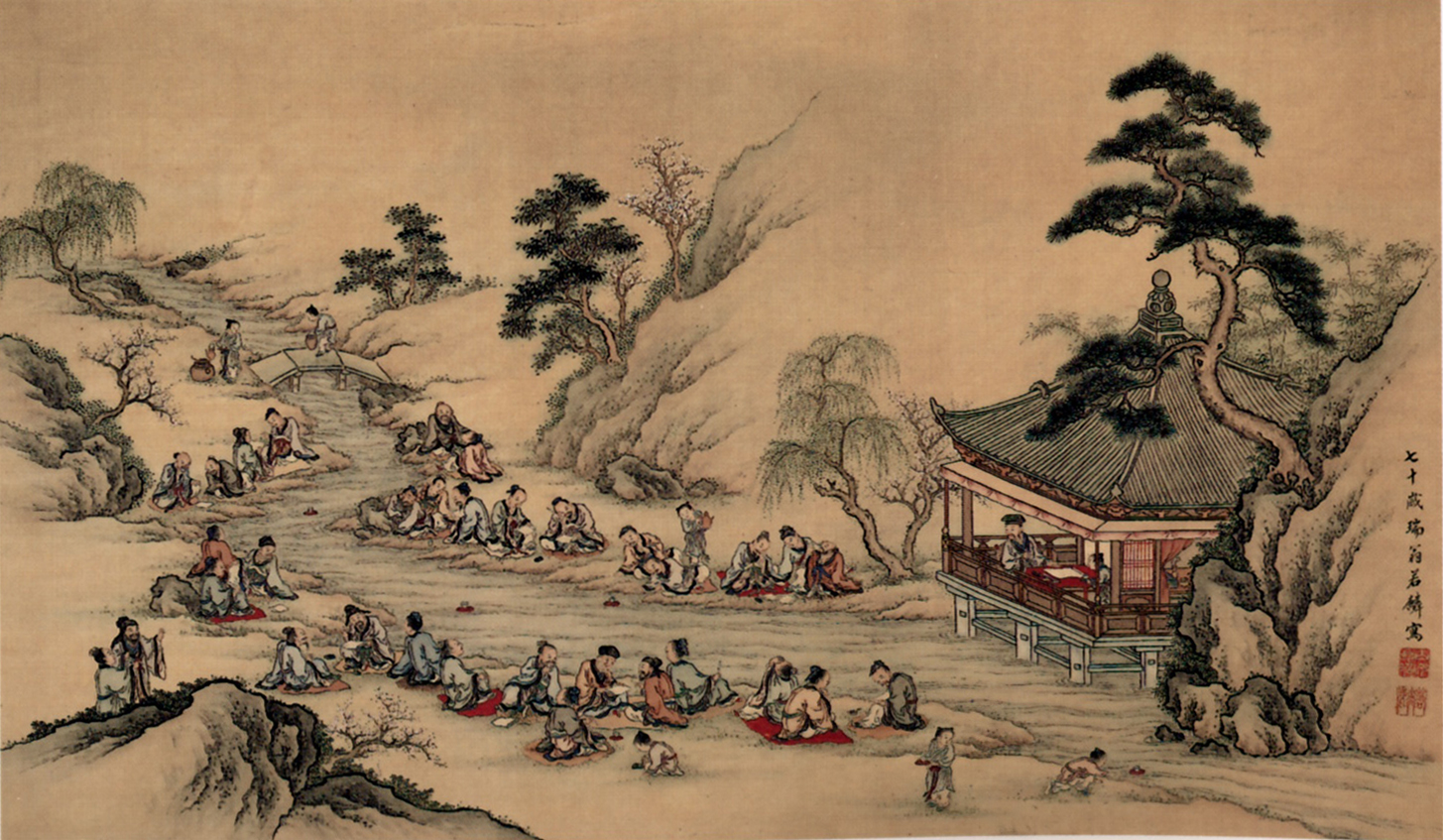
The Orchid Pavilion Gathering as depicted in an 18th-century Japanese painting.

Sun Chuo (traditional Chinese: 孫綽; simplified Chinese: 孙绰; pinyin: Sūn Chuò; Wade–Giles: Sun Ch'o) (320-377) was a Chinese poet of the Six Dynasties poetry tradition. He was one of the famous participants of the Orchid Pavilion Gathering, along with Wang Xizhi, and a large group of other scholar-poets, in 353 CE, in Shan-yin (now part of the modern province of Zhejiang). Sun Chuo is also famous for a fu upon the topic of Mount Tiantai, as well as his pioneering work on Chinese landscape poetry He was considered the foremost man of letters of his day.

== Poetry ==
One of his well-known poems was simply titled "Orchid Pavilion".

== Family ==
As a grandson of the Jin official Sun Chu (孙楚), Sun Chuo was also a cousin of Jin official/historian Sun Sheng; Sun Chu was also a grandson of the Cao Wei official Sun Zi (孙资).

== See also ==
- Classical Chinese poetry forms
- Filial piety
- History of graphic design
- Lantingji Xu
- Orchid Pavilion Gathering
- Six Dynasties poetry
