= Zhao Yi =

- 趙翼
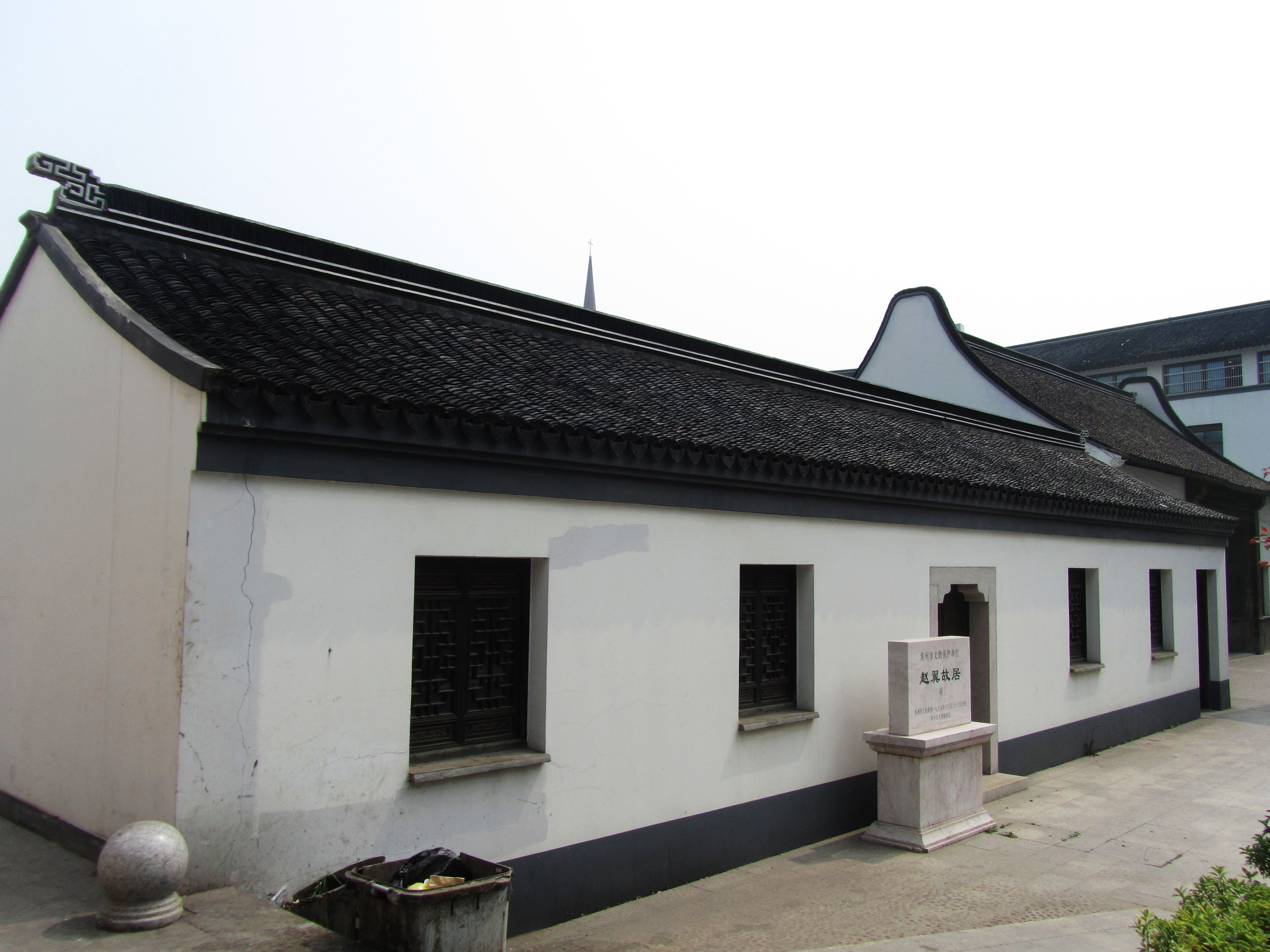
- Former Residence of Zhao Yi.
- Born: 1727; Changzhou, Jiangsu, China
- Died: 1814 (aged 86–87); Changzhou, Jiangsu, China
- Occupation: Poet
- Notable work: Notes on the Twenty-Two Dynastic Histories

Yunsong
- Traditional Chinese: 雲崧
- Simplified Chinese: 云崧
Transcriptions
Standard Mandarin
- Hanyu Pinyin: Yúnsōng

Yunsong
- Chinese: 耘崧
Transcriptions
Standard Mandarin
- Hanyu Pinyin: Yúnsōng

Oubei
- Traditional Chinese: 甌北
- Simplified Chinese: 瓯北
Transcriptions
Standard Mandarin
- Hanyu Pinyin: Oūbeǐ

Qiu'e
- Chinese: 裘萼
Transcriptions
Standard Mandarin
- Hanyu Pinyin: Qiú'è

Sanban Laoren
- Chinese: 三半老人
Transcriptions
Standard Mandarin
- Hanyu Pinyin: Sānbàn Lǎorén

Zhao Yi (Chinese: 趙翼; 1727–1814) was a poet, historian, and critic during the Qing dynasty in China. Zhao is notable for his innovative poetry, his historical writings (including Notes on the Twenty-Two Dynastic Histories), and for espousing unconventional views on various aspects of Chinese dynastic history.

== Education ==
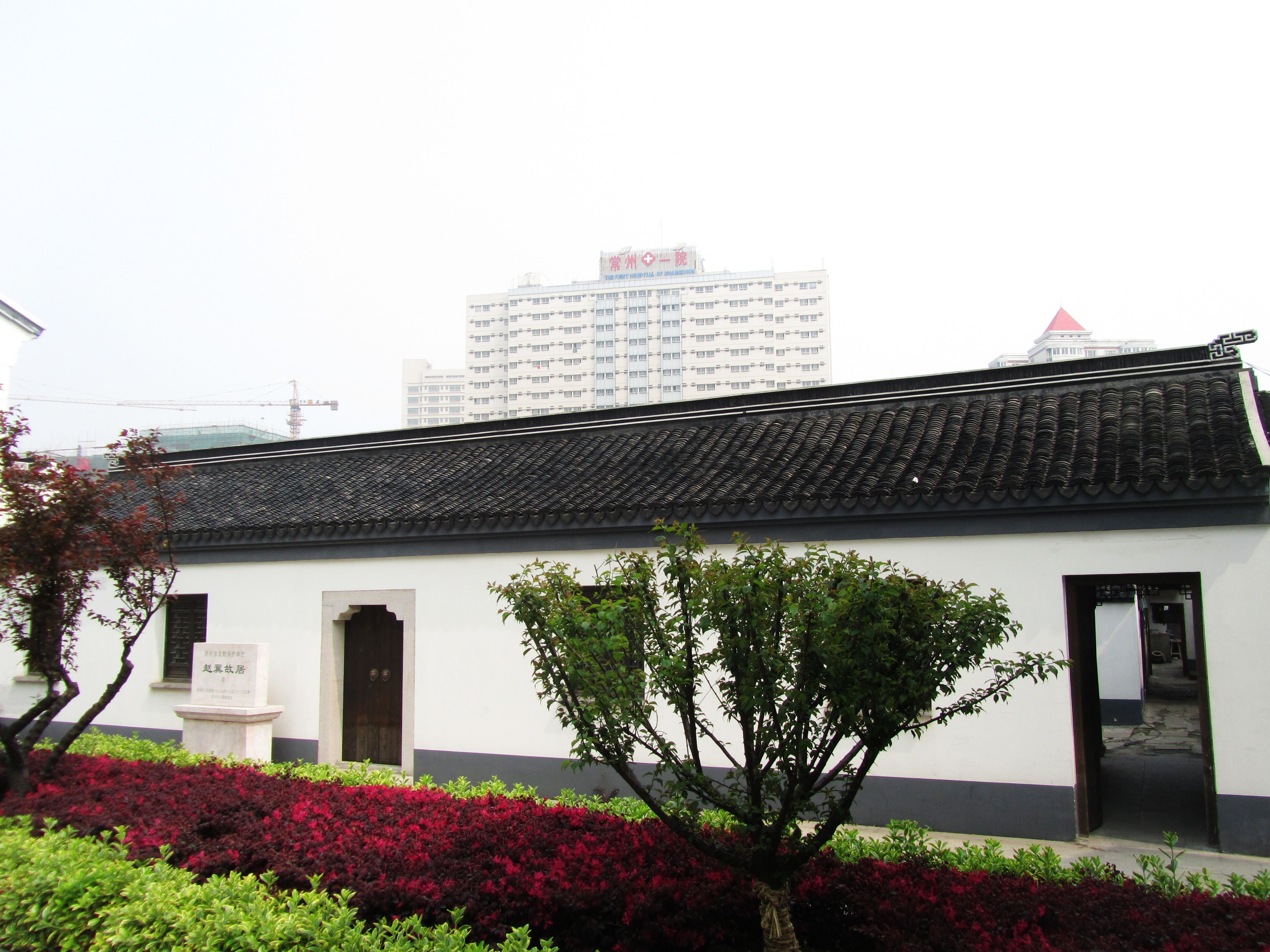
The Former Residence of Zhao Yi in Changzhou, Jiangsu

Zhao's early life exemplified the Confucian ideal of upward mobility from destitution through the skillful cultivation and use of intelligence, education, and personal connections. Like many other aspirants to social status in the Qing Empire, Zhao began his studies early in life. Zhao began his education before the age of five, and was recorded to have been a precocious learner. Later, Zhao was further spurred on to achieve educational and career success to ensure the well-being of his family after his father died when Zhao was only 14 years old.

In the imperial examination system, Zhao achieved admirable success, despite early setbacks. After apparently failing a local examination fourteen times, Zhao went on to earn his provincial degree in 1750 at the age of 23 on his second attempt, and later earned his metropolitan degree in 1761, placing third overall in his cohort behind Wang Jie and Hu Gaowang. Notably, Zhao specialized in the difficult Book of Rites (along with only 6% of his cohort), and incorporated emphasis on practical problems of government.

Even as he performed well in the imperial examination system, Zhao was notably defiant in his examination writings. In these writings, Zhao criticized the format and practices of the examination system, taking aim at issues including the imposed formal structure of examination writing as well as the failures of examiners in their duty both to those taking the exams and to the level of scholarly discourse.

== Poetry ==
At least in part because of an aversion to examination writing, Zhao delved into poetry. Zhao eventually became and is still remembered as one of the Three Masters of the Qianlong Period for his poetry (the others being Zhao's friends Yuan Mei and Jiang Shiquan).

The originality of Zhao's ideas on poetry were recognized in his own lifetime, as is attested to in the writings of his friend and fellow poet Yuan Mei who appreciated Zhao's poetic eccentricities as well as his unorthodox and rich literary influences, and drew a firm distinction between Zhao's work and that of his contemporaries who imitated Tang and Song poetry.

== Notable historical positions ==
For the compilation of works on the Dzungar campaign like Strategy for the pacification of the Dzungars (Pingding Zhunge'er fanglue), the Qing hired Zhao Yi and Jiang Yongzhi at the Military Archives Office, in their capacity as members of the Hanlin. Zhao wrote poems glorifying the Qing conquest and genocide of the Dzungar Mongols. Zhao Yi wrote the Yanpu zaji in "brush-notes" style, where military expenditures of the Qianlong Emperor's reign were recorded.

The Qianlong Emperor was praised as being the source of "eighteenth-century peace and prosperity" by Zhao Yi.

Zhao supported the view that historians and works of history were of great importance in China. In one instance, he argued that, while the Confucian Classics constituted the principles of Chinese dynastic government, it was works of history that provide the actual record of the government at work that could act as a guide to what historian Richard J. Smith calls, “proper conduct for the present and future.”

With regard to another historical position, Zhao was at odds with the still popular and (in modern times) patriotic view that the peace policy of the Southern Song dynasty toward the Jin dynasty was traitorous, and Zhao instead adopted the minority position he shared with the earlier Chinese scholar Wang Fuzhi that the peace policy saved the Southern Song from further defeat at the hands of the Jin. At least one modern Western scholar has taken a position that aligns with Zhao's, arguing that the peace policy was “validated by the later history of the Southern Sung.”

In another notable instance of an unconventional historical interpretation, Zhao espoused what historian Arthur Waldron terms a “realistic opinion” that the fall of the Ming dynasty was the fault of the Ming dynasty elites, who made empty words and were poorly informed. These elites opposed the peace efforts of the Chongzhen Emperor toward the Manchus, and this brought about unnecessary conflict that the Manchus had not intended. This view limits the responsibility of the Manchus for initiating Manchu-Ming conflict and shifts it to the Ming dynasty elites.

In one further notable divergence from many Chinese writers in his era and even more so during the Ming dynasty, Zhao offered praise for the efforts of the founder of the Qin dynasty, Qin Shihuang, to secure the northern borders of China with the early Great Wall rather than the criticisms of certain other Chinese writers (such as Wan Sitong and Li Mengyang).

== Assessment ==
Although because of various setbacks, Zhao failed to achieve the political influence which he had ambitions to attain in his lifetime and considered his professional career a failure, Zhao has been recognized as an important figure in Chinese history and historiography through the present day.
