= Qian Daxin =

Historian and linguist of the Qing dynasty in China

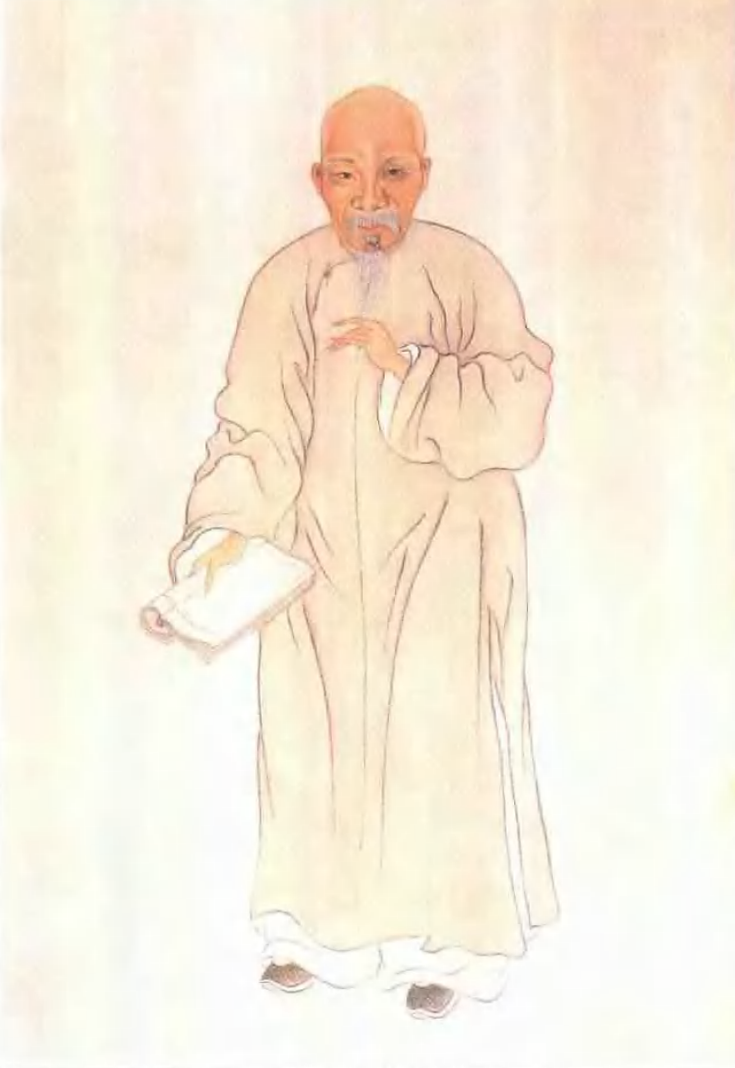
Qian Daxin

Qian Daxin (simplified Chinese: 钱大昕; traditional Chinese: 錢大昕; Wade–Giles: Ch'ien Ta-hsin; 1728–1804), courtesy names Xiaozheng (曉徵) and Jizhi (及之), art names Xinmei (辛楣) and Zhuting (竹汀), was a scholar-official, historian, and linguist of the Qing dynasty of China. He served as a commissioner of education and examinations in Guangdong Province.

As a proponent of kaozheng approach, Qian Daxin criticized moralizing ("praise and blame") interpretations of the Spring and Autumn Annals and argued that the importance of history should be deemed as valid as importance of the classics.

The diplomat Qian Qichen, who served as China's Foreign Minister and Vice Premier, was a descendant of Qian Daxin.

== Life ==
Qian Daxin was born in 1728, the 6th year of the Yongzheng reign. Qian Daxin started to teach at a very young age. He first taught in Gu's (顾) family's home, and he was able to get into the Gu's family library. The Gu family library is where Qian studied the classics and histories. He died in 1806, during the 9th year of the Jiaqing reign. During his early life Daxin achieved fame in the Southern area of the Yangtze River for his poetry and prose, which prompted the Qianlong emperor to grant Qian Daxin the title of "First-Degree Scholars (举人)" and give him a job as the Secretary of the Cabinet (内阁中书) in the 16th year of Qianlong reign (1751). In the 19th year of the Qianlong reign (1754), Qian Daxin took the imperial examination, was rewarded with a degree as an Imperial scholar (秀才), and was appointed as a member of the Hanlin Academy, which revised, edited, and criticized literary and history files. After this he focused on politics in the Guangdong area.

While a member of the Hanlin Academy, Qian Daxin always went to bookshops Liulichang (琉璃厂) like other Han Learning Scholars. Qian gathered together over three hundred rubbings of stone inscriptions from the Han and Tang dynasties. Qian noticed the importance of the material of rubbings in historical research; he then spent more time in buying, borrowing, and making rubbings.

Qian spent 15 years on completing his project, Examination of Variances in the Twenty-Two Dynastic Histories (廿二史考异). It was also a project that expanded his research on stone inscriptions and demonstrated their impact on 18th-century Chinese historians. As a result, Qian was able to create four collections of notes on his holdings; the number increased from 1800 to more than 2000 items.

Qian Daxin was one of the well-informed men of his time, focusing on Western astronomy and mathematics. Qian Daxin and Dai Zhen applied mathematics and used the ancient relics to convert ancient texts. They built a way for a cumulative field of investigation that came to a climax in 19th and 20th century breakthroughs in the application of epigraphy and archaeology to research on the oracle bones.

During Qian Daxin's lifetime, to some people, he was seen as a profound and specialized Academic Master. Scholars like Wang Chang (王昶), Duan Yucai, Wang Yinzhi, Ling Tingkan (凌廷堪), Ruan Yuan, and Jiang Fan (江藩) rated him highly. Qian Daxin was recommended by public acclaim to be the "Master of Confucianism" (一代儒宗).

== Advocating Han Confucianism ==
Qian Daxin was an advocate of Han Confucianism, as he liked its academic characteristic, which examined ancient texts as well as the names and characteristics of things. He also advocated Han Confucianism because it related to the past, the phonology of ancient text, and its similarity to the classic texts. Qian Daxin also frequently preferred Han Confucianism over the newer Confucianism.

Qian Daxin commented on the Han Confucianism classical studies, mostly commented on the technical level, in other words, mostly on the instrumental level. As for the ideology of the Han Confucianism classical studies, Qian rarely touched on.

== Character Evaluations ==
1. Wang Junyi (王俊义), a Qing historian, relatively commented on Qian Daxin's academic accomplishment, he pointed out that Qian Daxin had progressive political, and academical thoughts. Qian Daxin not only dug into the piles of paper. He was not separate from the real political struggles, and all kinds of questions in real life were reflected on different levels in Qian's academic reports. In addition, Wang Junyi also did research on Qian Daxin's concept of argumentation of speeches and essays.
2. Zhou Qingshu (周清澍), a history professor in Inner Mongolia University, summarized the accomplishment of Qian Daxin in Confucian classical studies, history, bibliography, phonology, land, official, clan, age, history of Yuan dynasty, etc. Zhou also thinks that in the Qianlong and Jiaqing periods, Qian was the broadest and most profound historian, and he also advocated many subjects.
3. Zhang Shunhui (张舜徽), a history professor in Central China Normal University, wrote an article "Qian Daxin's Learning note" 《钱大昕学记》, Zhang fully commented on Qian Daxin's academic accomplishments, and he gave extremely high rating.
4. Wang Jilu (王记录), was the history department head in Henan Normal University，Wang pointed out the academical advocation and opinion of Qian Daxin. It not only shows the academic characteristics of the Qianlong and Jiaqing period, but at some point, it exceeded how it was supposed to be at that period of time. Seeking the truth from facts was the core principle of Qian Daxin.
5. Ni Suoan (倪所安), also thinks that Qian Daxin had extensive and profound knowledge, and he had accomplishment in the area of classical studies, study of history, phonology of ancient texts, poems and prose. Especially in the area of history, developed, and enriched the theory and method of Chinese history, established Qian's high status in Chinese history.
6. Shi Ding (施丁) observed and studied about Qian Daxin's personality. Shi pointed out that had honest and humble characteristics, not only his behaviors, but also how he studied. He was nice, and honest to his fellow scholars. Qian was also respected and presented his ideas to senior scholars. To the ancient scholars, Qian only seek the truth from fact, but not making excessive demands. As for the younger generation, Qian sincerely guide and support. Comparing to the scholars overtimes, Qian was not arrogant and stingy, two undesirable characteristics. Shi thinks Qian's characteristics is worth to carry on.

== Published works ==
His works include:

- A Collection of Qian Yan Tang
- A Record of Studies in Shijia Study. 十駕齋養新録
- Reading Notes of Twenty-two History Books.
- Postscript to Qian Yan Tang Epigraphy.

He was also noted for his work revising material in history books, such as Yuan Dynasty History: Yi Wen Zhi and The Family Tree of Yuan Dynasty.
