= Yin Hao =

Jin Dynasty military general (died 356)

Yin Hao (殷浩; died 356), courtesy name Yuanyuan (渊源), (Note: To avoid naming taboo, his biography in the Tang-era Jin Shu recorded his courtesy name as Shenyuan (深源). His courtesy name being "Yuanyuan" was recorded in vol.249 of Taiping Yulan.) was a Chinese politician of the Jin dynasty.

== Background ==
Yin Hao was from an aristocratic family in Changping, and when he was young, he became known for intelligence and metaphysical discussions. His father Yin Xian (殷羡; fl.320-343) (Note: During Su Jun's rebellion, Yin Xian, as Tao Kan's subordinate, was well-known for advising Tao to attack Shitou quickly; this advice eventually led to Su's death.) served as the governor of Yuzhang (modern day Nanchang) during the Jianyuan era (343-344) of the reign of Emperor Kang of Jin; Xian's younger brother Yin Rong (殷融) was Yin Zhongkan's grandfather. Yin Hao's wife was Yuan Nühuang; her younger sister Nüzheng was Xie Shang's wife. The sisters were great-granddaughters of Yuan Huan.

== Life ==
Yin Hao temporarily served on Yu Liang's staff, but subsequently declined an invitation by Yu Liang's younger brother Yu Yi (庾翼) to serve on his staff, and he lived the life of a hermit. Gradually, officials and commoners began to believe that he had the ability to guide the Jin state to great things, and people even observed his behavior to venture guesses as to what the fortunes of the state would be. In 346, he finally agreed to join the government as the governor of the capital region.

In 348, after Huan Wen destroyed Cheng-Han and merged its territory into Jin's, key officials of the Jin imperial government began to fear that he would use his military might to try to dominate the government. The regent for Emperor Mu, Sima Yu the Prince of Kuaiji therefore invited Yin to participate in important government decisions. Yin and Huan immediately developed a rivalry and suspected each other of treachery.

In 350, intent on proving himself as much of a general as Huan, Yin had himself commissioned with a large army, preparing to recover central and northern China as rival Later Zhao was collapsing into civil war, but for reasons unknown delayed the campaign. Later that year, he took even greater power, as after another major official, Cai Mo, repeatedly declined an imperial honor, he accused Cai of being disrespectful and had Cai imprisoned. He was prepared to execute Cai, but was persuaded not to, but Cai was still demoted to commoner status.

Around the new year 352, Huan, upset that his requests to lead armies north had been rebuffed by Yin and Sima Yu, mobilized his troops and gestured as if he were about to attack the capital. Yin was shocked, and initially considered either resigning or send the imperial banner of peace (Zouyu Fan, 騶虞幡) to order Huan to stop. However, after advice from Wang Biaozhi (王彪之 (Note: Wang Biaozhi's biography in vol.76 of Jin Shu recorded that he was a son of Wang Bin (王彬), younger brother of Wang Yi (王廙); Wang Yi was an uncle of Wang Xizhi. According to the epitaph (晋王羲之妻郗璿墓识) of Wang Xizhi's wife Xi Xuan (郗璿; daughter of Xi Jian), a daughter of Yin Hao was the wife of Xizhi's fifth son Wang Suzhi. (次子肃之，字幼恭。妻陈国殷氏，父讳浩，字渊源，使 [ 持节 ]中军将军、扬州刺史。) Wang Biaozhi's granddaughter Wang Yingyan was the wife of Yin Zhongkan.)), he instead asked Sima Yu to write a carefully worded letter to Huan, persuading Huan to stop.

Later in 352, Yin launched his own campaign, but upon the start of the campaign, former Later Zhao generals in control of Xuchang and Luoyang rebelled, and his venture had to halt to deal with these rebellions. Subsequently, when his assistants, the generals Xie Shang and Yao Xiang tried to attack Zhang Yu (張遇), the general in control of Xuchang, Former Qin forces came to Zhang's aid and defeated Xie's troops. Yin then abandoned the campaign entirely.

In fall 352, Yin prepared a second campaign. Initially the campaign had some success, recovering Xuchang from Former Qin. However, Yin became suspicious of Yao's military capabilities and independence, and therefore tried to assassinate Yao. Yao discovered this, and, as Yin headed north, he ambushed Yin's troops, inflicting heavy losses on Yin. Yao then took over the Shouchun (壽春, in modern Lu'an, Anhui) region. The people despised Yin for his military losses, and Huan submitted a petition demanding Yin's ouster. The imperial government was compelled to demote Yin to commoner status and exile him to Xin'an (信安, in modern Quzhou, Zhejiang).

At a later point, Huan, still believing that Yin was capable, offered him an important purely civilian post, and wrote to Yin a letter stating his intentions. Yin was very pleased and was about to accept, but he, hesitating at the appropriate language for the acceptance, wrote and rewrote his response, and eventually, in a trance-like state from his anxiety, sent Huan a blank letter. When Huan received it, he was enraged, and from that point refused to have any further communication with Yin. Yin died in 356, while still in exile. After his death, a former subordinate Gu Yuezhi (father of Gu Kaizhi) submitted a memorial; after reading the memorial, the Jin imperial court posthumously restored Yin to his former position.

== Descendants ==
Hao's son Yin Juan (殷涓) had an excellent reputation. During the Xian'an era (371-372) of the reign of Emperor Jianwen of Jin, Huan Wen accused Yin Juan and Yu Qing (庾倩; son of Yu Bing) of plotting treason with Sima Xi (司马晞), Prince of Wuling and Emperor Jianwen's younger brother, and had Yin and Yu killed.
