= Xie Shang =

Jin dynasty general, writer and musician (308–357)

- 謝尚

General Who Maintains the West (安西將軍)
- In office ? – 352
- Monarch: Emperor Mu of Jin

General Who Establishes Might (建威將軍)
- In office 352–?
- Monarch: Emperor Mu of Jin

Inspector of Yuzhou (豫州刺史)
- In office 353–357
- Monarch: Emperor Mu of Jin

Personal details
- Born: 308
- Died: 357
- Spouse: Yuan Nüzheng
- Relations: Xie Zhenshi (Note: Lady Xie's name was not recorded in official histories, but was recorded in her father's epitaph, which was discovered in Nanjing on 10 Sep 1964. (《谢鲲墓志》：晋故豫章内史，陈国阳夏，谢鲲幼舆，以泰宁元年十一月廿八亡，假葬建康县石子岗，在阳大家墓东北四丈。妻中山刘氏，息尚仁祖，女真石。弟褒幼儒，弟广幼临，旧墓在荧阳。). Xie Shang's biography in Book of Jin recorded that Chu Suanzi was his niece.) (sister); Xie An (younger cousin); Chu Pou (brother-in-law); Chu Suanzi (niece)
- Children: Xie Kang (adopted); Xie Sengyao; Xie Sengshao; Wang Maozhi's wife
- Parent: Xie Kun (father)
- Occupation: Military general, poet
- Courtesy name: Renzu (仁祖)
- Posthumous name: Jian (简)

Xie Shang (308 – 14 June 357), courtesy name Renzu, was a Chinese military general, musician and writer of the Eastern Jin dynasty. He was a member of the Xie clan of Chen Commandery and was the elder cousin to the Jin prime minister Xie An. In the 350s, he participated in the expeditions to reclaim northern China for the Jin dynasty, his most important contribution being his recovery of the imperial seal, which had been lost in the north decades prior. Although a general, Shang was mostly known for his talents in art and music. He was one of the earlier known players of the pipa and helped popularize bells and stone chimes in southern China.

== Life and career ==
=== Early life and career ===
Xie Shang was born in Chen Commandery in 308, during the reign of Emperor Huai, as the son of the Prefect of Yuzhang (豫章; around present-day Nanchang, Jiangxi), Xie Kun. His brother died when he was only seven years old (by East Asian reckoning), while his father died when he was about 15 years old. (Note: Shang's biography in Jin Shu used "十余岁", which could mean that he was in his teens. The figure of 15 is calculated based on his birth year of c.308 and Xie Kun's death in Jan 324 in the Julian calendar, based on the date given in the latter's epitaph.) On both of their funerals, he displayed maturity which puzzled the guests and captured their attention. At his brother's funeral, he was told by his father to seat with the guests. One of the guests openly remarked "This child is a Yan Hui in the seats," but Xie Shang rebuked, "How can you tell a Yan Hui without a Zhongni in the seats?" On his father's funeral in early 324, (Note: While Xie Kun's death date was not recorded in official histories, his epitaph indicated that he died on the 28th day of the 11th month of the 1st year of the Taining (note that the epitaph used a different character for the word "Tai") era of Sima Shao's reign. This corresponds to 10 Jan 324 in the proleptic Gregorian calendar.) the Jin official Wen Jiao came and visit him to console him. Wen thought that Shang's mourning was excessive for a child (or teen) of his age, and he saw great potential in him because of this.

By the time he reached adulthood, Xie Shang was known for his intelligence and wits. He avoided vulgar acts, his worst instance only being that he loved wearing flashy clothes and pants which he later stopped after his uncles advised him to. The Prime Minister, Wang Dao, favoured him a lot as he reminded him of his relative Wang Rong, one of the Seven Sages of the Bamboo Groves. Because of this, Wang would call him "Little Anfeng (小安豐)". (Note: Wang Rong's peerage was Marquis of Anfeng.) Once he was old enough, Shang inherited his father's title of Marquis of Xian. In the government, Xie Shang served a number of offices in the government and kept those offices for the rest of his life.

Shang would often visit the General Who Maintains the West, Yu Yi at Wuchang to discuss with him about military affairs. One time, the two were practicing archery when Yu said to Shang, "If you hit the target, I shall vouch for you a promotion." Shang drew his bow and managed to get a bullseye, so Yu did just as he promised. Shang was simple and incorruptible in his governance. His soldiers built a dark-clothed tent made from 40 pieces of cloth. Shang had it torn down and distributed the cloth among his men. In 344, during the reign of Emperor Kang of Jin, Xie Shang became General of the Household Gentlemen of the South. Around the same time, Yu Yi's influential brother, Yu Bing, died and there were considerations to have Xie Shang replace him to diminish the Yu clan's power. However, Yu Yi knew of this and intervened, so Shang retained his old positions.

=== Northern expeditions ===
In 352, the Jin Grand Marshal, Yin Hao (Note: also Xie Shang's brother-in-law; their wives were sisters and great-granddaughters of Yuan Huan.) was petitioned to lead a campaign to reclaim Luoyang and Xuchang in northern China. Yin Hao had Xie Shang and Xun Xian to serve as his generals during the campaign. The warlord in Xuchang, Zhang Yu (張遇), had previously surrendered to Jin. Xie was tasked in appeasing him but failed. As a result, Zhang Yu lost confidence in Jin and rebelled, seizing Xuchang and Luoyang for himself.

Around the same time, the Qiang chieftain, Yao Xiang had arrived in Jin from the recently destroyed Later Zhao state. He submitted to Jin and began immediately serving in the northern expedition by being stationed at Qiao (譙; present-day Bozhou, Anhui). Xiang rode on his horse and crossed the Huai River to visit Xie Shang at Shouchun. Shang sent away his attendants and guards as he wanted to personally meet with Yao Xiang, who he knew for his fame. Shang recognized him even when he wore a common headscarf, and the two talked with one another like old friends.

The Heavenly King of Ran Wei, Ran Min was captured by Former Yan forces later in 352. His general Jiang Gan (蔣幹), who was ordered to defend Ye before Min's death, was on the verge of defeat as Yan forces placed the city under siege. He submitted to Jin and asked Xie Shang to help him, so Xie sent his general Dai Shi (戴施) to save him at Ye. During the course of the defence, Dai managed to trick Jiang into giving him the imperial seal, and kept it at his camp in Fangtou (枋頭, in modern Hebi, Henan).

Meanwhile, Xie Shang and Yao Xiang attacked Zhang Yu at Xuchang, so Zhang was offered reinforcements by Former Qin forces led by Fu Xiong. Xie fought the Qin at Chengqiao (誠橋; near Xuchang) along the Ying River where he was badly routed and lost 15,000 soldiers. Shang fled to Huainan while Yao Xiang abandoned his baggages to escort him. Shang's defeat prompted Yin Hao to retreat to Shouchun, and Shang was demoted to General Who Establishes Might. Later on, Shang returned the imperial seal which Dai Shi recovered to the Jin court, and he was greatly congratulated by the officials. (Note: This account is based on Xie Shang's biography in the Book of Jin. In the annals of Emperor Mu in the same record, it was Dai Shi who directly sent the seal to the court rather than Shang.)

Xie Shang attacked Xuchang again after returning the seal. This time he sent his Champion General Wang Xia (王俠) to capture and Wang drove out Former Qin's Inspector of Yuzhou out from the city. Shang was promoted to Official Who Concurrently Serves in the Palace and camped at Shitou. For the next few years, Xie remained on the defensive and was given new important positions each year. When Yao Xiang rebelled in 353, Shang was stationed south of the Huai river, as the court hoped that their friendship may result in Xiang returning to Jin, although this did not happen during the two's remaining lifetime.

=== Illness and death ===
In 356, Huan Wen captured Luoyang and had a petition to have Xie Shang guard Luoyang. However, Shang was greatly sick at the start of 357, so the Intendant of Danyang, Wang Huzhi (王胡之), took his place while Shang was summoned to Jiankang to be made Guard General and Cavalier In Regular Attendance. However, before he could arrive, Shang succumbed to his illness and died. The court posthumously gave him his intended offices along with the privilege of a Separate Office with equal ceremonial to the Three Excellencies and posthumously named him "Jian (简)".

== Arts and literary works ==
Although Xie Shang had been a general for most of his career, his talents mostly laid in arts and literary works. When Xie Shang went to meet with Wang Dao to receive his first office, Wang was about to hold an event at his mansion, and he asked Shang if he could perform the Quyuwu (鴝鵒舞) (Note: The "Quyu" (鴝鵒) is the crested myna or Chinese starling as it is more commonly known. Quyuwu is a dance that mimics the movement of the bird.) dance for his guests. Shang agreed, and at the festival, Wang and his guests were impressed by his techniques and applauded him.

Shang was also talented at playing instruments, the most notable being the pipa as he was one of the earlier players to use such an instrument. It was also said that Shang could perform the pipa with his legs raised. Apart from the pipa, he played the Guzheng, and once performed it in front of Huan Wen who requested it. While he was guarding Shouchun in around 353, Shang gathered the local musicians to play stone chimes in the court. The people greatly enjoyed them, and bells and stone chimes eventually became popular among the southern Chinese.

Other than that, Shang was skilled at cursive script, although none of his works had survived. The famous Song dynasty calligrapher, Su Shi had mentioned them in his "Dongpo Inscription" (東坡題跋). The Book of Sui compiled ten of his poems in the Xie Shang Ji (謝尚集) but only five survived through the Tang dynasty and none of them exists today. His only known work that fully survived to this day is a short poem he titled Song of the Great Dao (大道曲). Others that exists as snippets are Poems for Wang Biaozhi (贈王彪之詩) and Song of the Zheng (箏歌).
