= Family tree of Sima Yi =

3rd century members of the Sima family

Sima Yi (179–251) was a general, politician and regent of the state of Cao Wei (220–266) in the Three Kingdoms period (220–280) in China. Two of his sons, Sima Shi (208–255) and Sima Zhao (211–265), rose to power in the 250s and consecutively served as regents throughout the reigns of the last three Wei emperors. After Sima Zhao died in September 265, his son Sima Yan (236–290) forced the last Wei ruler, Cao Huan (246–303), to abdicate the throne in his favour in February 266, ending the Wei regime and establishing the Jin dynasty (266–420). This article contains the family trees of Sima Yi, his brothers, and their descendants up to Sima Yan's generation. For more details on the family trees of the Jin emperors (Sima Yan's generation and beyond), see Chinese emperors family tree (early)#Jin Dynasty and Chu.

== Sima Fang and earlier ==
Gaoyang 高陽
Chongli 重黎
Xiufu, Earl of Cheng 程伯休父
Sima Ang 司馬卬
Sima Jun 司馬鈞; Shuping 叔平
Sima Liang 司馬量; Gongdu 公度
Sima Jun 司馬儁; Yuanyi 元異
Sima Fang 司馬防; Jiangong 建公
Sima Lang 司馬朗; Boda 伯達	Sima Yi 司馬懿; Zhongda 仲達	Sima Fu 司馬孚; Shuda 叔達	Sima Kui 司馬馗; Jida 季達	Sima Xun 司馬恂; Xianda 顯達	Sima Jin 司馬進; Huida 惠達	Sima Tong 司馬通; Yada 雅達	Sima Min 司馬敏; Youda 幼達

Sima Fang had eight sons (ranked in decreasing order of seniority) – Sima Lang, Sima Yi, Sima Fu, Sima Kui, Sima Xun, Sima Jin, Sima Tong and Sima Min – who were collectively known as the "Eight Das" because their courtesy names all contained the Chinese character da (達). Sima Fang's father was Sima Jun (司馬儁). Sima Jun's father was Sima Liang. Sima Liang's father was Sima Jun (司馬鈞). Sima Jun (司馬鈞) was an eighth-generation descendant of Sima Ang. Sima Ang descended from Cheng Boxiufu. Cheng Boxiufu was a descendant of Chongli, a son of Gaoyang.

== Sima Lang ==
Sima Lang 司馬朗; Boda 伯達
Sima Yi 司馬遺	Sima Wang^{1} 司馬望; Zichu 子初
Sima Hong 司馬洪; Kongye 孔業

Sima Lang's son was Sima Yi. Sima Lang's younger brother, Sima Fu, allowed his son Sima Wang to be Sima Lang's successor. Sima Wang was succeeded by his son Sima Hong.

^{1}Sima Wang was actually Sima Fu's son. He succeeded his uncle Sima Lang.

== Sima Yi ==
Xun Yu 荀彧; Wenruo 文若	Zhang Chunhua 張春華	Lady Zhang 張氏	Sima Yi 司馬懿; Zhongda 仲達	Lady Bai 柏氏	Lady Fu 伏氏
Xun Yun 荀惲; Changqian 長倩	Sima Rong 司馬肜; Zihui 子徽	Princess; Gaolingxuan 高陵宣公主	Du Yu 杜預; Yuankai 元凱	Sima Lun 司馬倫; Ziyi 子彝
Xun Yi 荀霬	Princess; Nanyang^{1} 南陽公主	Sima Shi 司馬師; Ziyuan 子元	Sima Gan 司馬幹; Ziliang 子良	Sima Zhao 司馬昭; Zishang 子上	Sima Liang 司馬亮; Ziyi 子翼	Sima Zhou 司馬伷; Zijiang 子將	Sima Jing 司馬京; Zizuo 子佐	Sima Jun 司馬駿; Zizang 子臧

Sima Yi had four wives: Zhang Chunhua, Lady Fu, Lady Zhang and Lady Bai.

He had three sons and a daughter with Zhang Chunhua: Sima Shi, Sima Zhao, Sima Gan and Princess Nanyang (personal name unknown). Princess Nanyang married Xun Yun's son Xun Yi. Xun Yun was Xun Yu's son.

He had four sons with Lady Fu: Sima Liang, Sima Zhou, Sima Jing and Sima Jun. Sima Jing died early (presumably without a male heir) and was succeeded by Sima Zhao's son Sima Ji.

He had a son with Lady Zhang: Sima Rong. Sima Rong had no son and was succeeded by Sima Xi (司馬禧), a son of Sima Zhou's son Sima Dan.

He had a son with Lady Bai: Sima Lun.

Sima Yi also had another daughter – Princess Gaolingxuan (personal name unknown) – who was married to Du Yu. The identity of Princess Gaolingxuan's mother is not known.

^{1}The Sanguozhi mentioned that Xun Yi married a younger sister of Sima Shi and Sima Zhao, but did not specifically mention that she was Princess Nanyang. It is assumed that this "younger sister" of Sima Shi and Sima Zhao was Princess Nanyang because she was their only biological sister, according to the Jin Shu. In addition, Pan Yue's "Eulogy to Elder Princess of Nanyang" (《南阳长公主诔》) had a line referencing the Xun clan (“言告言归，作合于荀”).

=== Sima Shi ===
Yang Xu 羊續; Xingzu 興祖	Cai Yong 蔡邕; Bojie 伯喈	Cao Shao 曹邵 / Qin Bonan 秦伯南
Yang Chen 羊茞	Lady Cai 蔡氏	Cai Yan 蔡琰; Wenji 文姬	Cao Zhen 曹真; Zidan 子丹	Lady of Deyang District 德陽鄉主	Xiahou Shang 夏侯尚; Boren 伯仁
Yang Hu 羊祜; Shuzi 叔子	Yang Cheng 羊承	Yang Huiyu 羊徽瑜	Sima Shi 司馬師; Ziyuan 子元	Xiahou Hui 夏侯徽; Yuanrong 媛容	Xiahou Xuan 夏侯玄; Taichu 太初
Wu Zhi 吳質; Jizhong 季重	Daughter (name unknown)	Daughter (name unknown)	Daughter (name unknown)
Lady Wu 吳氏	Daughter (name unknown)	Daughter (name unknown)	Zhen De 甄德

Sima Shi had three wives: Xiahou Hui, Lady Wu (personal name unknown) and Yang Huiyu.

Lady Wu was Wu Zhi's daughter.

Yang Huiyu was the daughter of Yang Chen and Lady Cai. She had two brothers: Yang Cheng (elder) and Yang Hu (younger). Yang Chen's father was Yang Xu. Lady Cai had a sister, Cai Wenji, and their father was Cai Yong. Yang Huiyu did not have any sons with Sima Shi. It is not known if they had any daughters.

Xiahou Hui was the daughter of Xiahou Shang and the Lady of Deyang District (personal name unknown). Her brother was Xiahou Xuan. The Lady of Deyang District was Cao Zhen's younger sister. Xiahou Hui bore Sima Shi five daughters but no sons. One of the five daughters was married to Zhen De but she died early. The names of the five daughters are not known.

=== Sima Zhao ===
Wang Lang 王朗; Jingxing 景興
Wang Su 王肅; Ziyong 子雍
Sima Zhao 司馬昭; Zishang 子上	Wang Yuanji 王元姬
Sima Yan 司馬炎; Anshi 安世	Sima You 司馬攸; Dayou 大猷	Sima Zhao 司馬兆; Qianqiu 千秋	Sima Dingguo 司馬定國	Sima Guangde 司馬廣德	Princess Jingzhao 京兆公主	Zhen De 甄德
Sima Jian 司馬鑒; Daming 大明	Sima Ji 司馬機; Taixuan 太玄	Sima Yongzuo 司馬永祚	Sima Yanzuo 司馬延祚; Dasi 大思	Princess; Changshan 常山公主	Wang Ji 王濟

Sima Zhao had nine sons and two daughters. Five of his sons – Sima Yan, Sima You, Sima Zhao, Sima Dingguo and Sima Guangde – were born to his wife Wang Yuanji, but only the two eldest survived childhood. They also had a daughter – Princess Jingzhao, whose personal name is unknown. Princess Jingzhao married Zhen De after Zhen's first wife (Sima Shi's daughter) died early. Wang Yuanji's father was Wang Su. Wang Su's father was Wang Lang. Sima Zhao's four other sons – Sima Jian, Sima Ji, Sima Yongzuo and Sima Yanzuo – were not born to Wang Yuanji. Sima Yongzuo and Sima Yanzuo both died young. The identities of their mothers are unknown. Sima Zhao's other daughter, Princess Changshan, married Wang Ji (王濟), a grandson of Wang Chang and son of Wang Hun. The identity of her mother is also unknown.

=== Sima Gan ===
Sima Gan 司馬幹; Ziliang 子良
Sima Guang 司馬廣	Sima Yong 司馬永

Sima Gan had two sons: Sima Guang and Sima Yong.

=== Sima Liang ===
		Sima Liang 司馬亮; Ziyi 子翼
Sima Sui 司馬粹; Maohong 茂弘	Sima Ju 司馬矩; Yanming 延明	Sima Yang 司馬羕; Yannian 延年	Sima Zong 司馬宗; Yanzuo 延祚	Sima Xi 司馬熙

Sima Liang had five sons: Sima Sui, Sima Ju, Sima Yang, Sima Zong and Sima Xi.

=== Sima Zhou ===
Xiahou Yuan 夏侯淵; Miaocai 妙才
Xiahou Wei 夏侯威; Jiquan 季權	Zhuge Dan 諸葛誕; Gongxiu 公休
Xiahou Zhuang 夏侯莊; Zhongrong 仲容	Sima Zhou 司馬伷; Zijiang 子將	Lady Zhuge 諸葛氏
Xiahou Guangji 夏侯光姬; Tonghuan 銅環	Sima Jin 司馬覲; Sizu 思祖	Sima Yao 司馬繇; Sixuan 思玄	Sima Cui 司馬漼; Sichong 思沖	Sima Dan 司馬澹; Sihong 思弘	Lady Guo 郭氏

Sima Zhou married Lady Zhuge, Zhuge Dan's daughter. They had four sons: Sima Jin, Sima Dan, Sima Yao and Sima Cui. Sima Dan's wife, Lady Guo, was a sister-in-law of Empress Jia Nanfeng. Sima Jin's wife was Xiahou Guangji. Xiahou Guangji was the daughter of Xiahou Zhuang, the son of Xiahou Wei and a grandson of Xiahou Yuan.

=== Sima Jun ===
	Sima Jun 司馬駿; Zizang 子臧
Sima Chang 司馬暢; Xuanshu 玄舒	Sima Xin 司馬歆; Hongshu 弘舒	(eight other sons, names unknown)

Sima Jun had ten sons, among whom the most notable ones are Sima Chang and Sima Xin. The names of the other eight sons are not recorded in history.

=== Sima Lun ===
	Sima Lun 司馬倫; Ziyi 子彝
Sima Kua 司馬荂	Sima Fu 司馬馥	Sima Qian 司馬虔	Sima Xu 司馬詡

Sima Lun had four sons: Sima Kua, Sima Fu, Sima Qian and Sima Xu.

== Sima Fu ==
Sima Fu 司馬孚; Shuda 叔達
Sima Yong 司馬邕; Zikui 子魁	Sima Wang 司馬望; Zichu 子初	Sima Huang 司馬晃; Ziming 子明
Sima Gui 司馬瓌; Ziquan 子泉	Sima Gui 司馬珪; Zizhang 子璋	Sima Heng 司馬衡; Ziping 子平	Sima Fu 司馬輔	Sima Jing 司馬景; Ziwen 子文	Sima Yi 司馬翼; Zishi 子世
Sima Yong 司馬顒; Wenzai 文載	Sima Ji^{1} 司馬緝	Sima Dun^{2} 司馬敦	Sima Hong 司馬弘	Sima Tao 司馬韜	Sima Cheng^{3} 司馬承

Sima Fu had nine sons: Sima Yong (Zikui), Sima Wang, Sima Fu (Prince Cheng of Taiyuan), Sima Yi, Sima Huang, Sima Gui (Ziquan), Sima Gui (Zizhang), Sima Heng and Sima Jing.

Sima Gui (Ziquan)'s son was Sima Yong.

Sima Gui (Zizhang) had no son. He was succeeded by his nephew Sima Ji, a son of Sima Fu (Prince Cheng of Taiyuan).

Sima Heng had no son. He was succeeded by his nephew Sima Dun, the fourth son of Sima Yong (Zikui).

Sima Jing's son was Sima Tao.

Sima Fu (Prince Cheng of Taiyuan)'s son was Sima Hong.

Sima Yi (Zishi) was succeeded by his nephew Sima Cheng, a son of Sima Yong (Zikui).

- ^{1}Sima Ji was actually Sima Fu (Prince Cheng of Taiyuan)'s son. He succeeded his uncle Sima Gui (Zizhang).
- ^{2}Sima Dun was actually Sima Yong (Zikui)'s son. He succeeded his uncle Sima Heng.
- ^{3}Sima Cheng was actually Sima Yong (Zikui)'s son. He succeeded his uncle Sima Yi (Zishi).

=== Sima Yong ===
Sima Yong 司馬邕; Zikui 子魁
Sima Chong 司馬崇	Sima Long 司馬隆

Sima Yong (Zikui)'s son was Sima Chong. Sima Chong had a younger brother, Sima Long.

=== Sima Wang ===
	Sima Wang 司馬望; Zichu 子初
Sima Yi 司馬弈	Sima Hong 司馬洪; Kongye 孔業	Sima Zheng 司馬整	Sima Mao 司馬楙; Kongwei 孔偉

Sima Wang succeeded his uncle Sima Lang. He had four sons: Sima Yi, Sima Hong, Sima Zheng and Sima Mao.

=== Sima Huang ===
Sima Huang 司馬晃; Ziming 子明
Sima Pou 司馬裒	Sima Chuo 司馬綽

Sima Huang had two sons: Sima Pou and Sima Chuo.

== Sima Kui ==
Sima Kui 司馬馗; Jida 季達
Sima Tai 司馬泰; Zishu 子舒	Sima Quan 司馬權; Ziyu 子輿	Sima Sui 司馬綏; Zidu 子都
Sima Yue 司馬越; Yuanchao 元超	Sima Teng 司馬騰; Yuanmai 元邁	Sima Lue 司馬略; Yuanjian 元簡	Sima Mo 司馬模; Yuanbiao 元表	Sima Zhi 司馬植	Sima Xiao 司馬虓; Wuhui 武會

Sima Kui had three sons: Sima Quan, Sima Tai and Sima Sui. Sima Quan's son was Sima Zhi. Sima Tai had four sons: Sima Yue, Sima Teng, Sima Lue and Sima Mo. Sima Sui's son was Sima Xiao.

== Sima Xun ==
Sima Xun 司馬恂; Xianda 顯達
Sima Sui 司馬遂; Zibo 子伯
Sima Dan 司馬耽	Sima Ji 司馬緝

Sima Xun's son was Sima Sui. Sima Sui had two sons: Sima Dan and Sima Ji.

== Sima Jin ==
Sima Jin 司馬進; Huida 惠達
Sima Xun 司馬遜; Ziti 子悌	Sima Mu 司馬睦; Ziyou 子友
Sima Sui 司馬隨	Sima Cheng 司馬承; Jingcai 敬才	Sima Wei 司馬蔚

Sima Jin had two sons: Sima Xun and Sima Mu. Sima Xun had two sons: Sima Sui and Sima Cheng. Sima Mu's son was Sima Wei.

== Sima Tong ==
Sima Tong 司馬通; Yada 雅達
Sima Ling 司馬陵; Zishan 子山	Sima Bin 司馬斌; Zizheng 子政	Sima Shun 司馬順; Zisi 子思
Sima Ji 司馬濟	Sima Yin 司馬隱

Sima Tong had three sons: Sima Ling, Sima Shun and Sima Bin. Sima Ling's son was Sima Ji. Sima Bin's son was Sima Yin.

== See also ==
- Chinese emperors family tree (early)#Jin dynasty and Chu
- Cao Wei family trees
- Shu Han family trees
- Eastern Wu family trees
