= Sima (Chinese surname) =

Sima (Szema)
- Sima in regular script
- Pronunciation: Sīmǎ (Pinyin); Su-má (Pe̍h-ōe-jī)
- Language: Chinese

Origin
- Language: Chinese language
- Origin: One of the offices of the Zhou dynasty's Three Excellencies
- Meaning: horse master

Other names
- Variant forms: Sima (Mandarin); Suma (Hokkien); Sma (English)
- See also: Szema

Sima ([sɹ̩́mà], simplified Chinese: 司马; traditional Chinese: 司馬; pinyin: Sīmǎ; Wade–Giles: Ssu-ma) is a Chinese family name. It is one of the rare two-character Chinese family names; most Chinese family names consist of only a single character. It is an occupational surname, literally meaning "control" (sī) "horses" mǎ, or "horse officer". The family name originated from one of the offices of the Zhou dynasty.

== History ==
The Sima clan were said to be the descendants of the mythological figures Gaoyang and Chongli (Gaoyang's son). They served as xiaguan (夏官; "officers of summer") (Note: See the Rites of Zhou for details on the Offices of Summer.) in the reigns of the mythical emperors Yao and Shun and through the Xia and Shang dynasties. During the Zhou dynasty, officials holding the appointment of xiaguan oversaw military affairs and were collectively known as "xiaguan sima". Cheng-bo Xiufu (程伯休甫), a descendant of Chongli (Zhurong), helped King Xuan of the Zhou dynasty consolidate his rule over his kingdom. In return, the king awarded aristocratic status to Chengbo Xiufu's clan. Chengbo Xiufu and his descendants adopted Sima as their family name.

In the late Zhou dynasty, the Sima clan migrated to the states of Wei, Zhao and Qin. The Sima family in Qin included Sima Cuo (司馬錯), a general who was the commander-in-chief of Qin's conquest of Shu. Sima Jin (司马靳), Cuo's grandson, was a deputy general who battled alongside Bai Qi during the Battle of Changping. Jin's descendants served Qin and Han. Jin's fifth-generation descendant was Sima Tan, a Han dynasty court astrologer, and his son was Sima Qian, the author of Records of the Grand Historian.

In the late Qin dynasty, Sima Ang served as a general in the insurgent Zhao state and joined other rebel forces in overthrowing the Qin dynasty. After the fall of the Qin dynasty, Sima Ang declared himself the king of a separate state, Yin (殷), with its capital in Henei (河內; in present-day Henan).

In the early Han dynasty, Sima Ang's kingdom became a commandery of the Han Empire and his descendants had lived there since.

Sima Yi, a descendant of Sima Ang, served as an official, military general and regent of the Cao Wei state in the Three Kingdoms period. His grandson, Sima Yan, usurped the throne from the last Cao Wei emperor and established the Jin dynasty. After the Jin dynasty ended, many members of the Sima clan changed their surname to avoid persecution.

== List of people with the surname ==
=== Early Simas ===
- Xiufu, Earl of Cheng, first took the title Sima as his surname
- Sima Geng (Ziniu), disciple of Confucius
- Sima Rangju, Jiang Qi military leader and Tian clansman, author of The Methods of the Sima
- Sima Shang, General of the State of Zhao
- Sima Xin, Qin dynasty official and general, later King of Sai.

=== Sima Cuo and descendants ===
- Sima Cuo, important Qin General
- Sima Xiangru, a minor official during the Western Han dynasty but better known for his poetic skills, Chinese wine (jiu) business and controversial marriage to a widow Zhuo Wenjun after both eloped.
- Sima Tan, Sima Cuo's descendant, historian during the Western Han dynasty
- Sima Qian, Sima Tan's son, historian during the Western Han dynasty and author of Records of the Grand Historian

=== Sima Ang and descendants ===
- Sima Ang, Qin dynasty official, later King of Yin
- Sima Fang, Sima Ang's descendant, Han dynasty official and Sima Yi's father.
- Sima Yi, Sima Fang's second son, Cao Wei regent, general and politician.
- Sima Lang, Sima Yi's elder brother, Han dynasty politician.
- Sima Fu, Sima Yi's younger brother, Cao Wei politician.
- Sima Jin, Sima Yi's younger brother was a Cao Wei politician.
- Sima Shi, Sima Yi's eldest son, Cao Wei general and regent.
- Sima Zhao, Sima Yi's second son, Cao Wei general and regent.
- Sima Yan, Sima Zhao's son, founding emperor of the Jin dynasty (266–420).
- Sima Wang, Sima Fu's son, Cao Wei politician.
- Sima Liang, Sima Yi's fourth son, first among the Eight Princes
- Sima Wei, fifth son of Emperor Wu of Jin, second among the Eight Princes
- Sima Lun, Sima Yi's youngest son, third among the Eight Princes
- Sima Jiong, son of Sima You, fourth among the Eight Princes
- Sima Ai, sixth son of Emperor Wu of Jin, fifth among the Eight Princes
- Sima Ying, 16th son of Emperor Wu of Jin, sixth among the Eight Princes
- Sima Yong, Sima Fu's grandson, seventh among the Eight Princes
- Sima Yue, cousin of Emperor Wu of Jin, eighth among the Eight Princes
- Sima Zhong, second emperor of the Jin dynasty
- Sima Chi, third emperor of the Jin dynasty
- Sima Ye, fourth emperor of the Jin dynasty
- Sima Rui, fifth emperor of the Jin dynasty and founder of the Eastern Jin dynasty
- Sima Shao, sixth emperor of the Jin dynasty
- Sima Yan, seventh emperor of the Jin dynasty
- Sima Yue, emperor of the Jin dynasty
- Sima Dan, emperor of the Jin dynasty
- Sima Pi, emperor of the Jin dynasty
- Sima Yi, emperor of the Jin dynasty
- Sima Yu, emperor of the Jin dynasty
- Sima Yao, emperor of the Jin dynasty
- Sima Dezong, emperor of the Jin dynasty
- Sima Dewen, last emperor of the Jin dynasty
- Sima Guang, historian and statesman during the Song dynasty, known for his monumental historical work Zizhi Tongjian and rivalry against contemporary Wang Anshi. There is a popular story of him, as a youth, saving someone who fell into a large water pot by smashing it with a rock.

=== Modern bearers ===
- Sire Ma, Hong Kong actress from Chongqing born with the surname Sima.
- Sima Nan, Chinese scholar, journalist, social commentator.
- Sima Pingbang (司馬平邦), Chinese scholar, social commentator.

== See also ==
- Jin dynasty (266–420)
- Records of the Grand Historian
- Family tree of Sima Yi
- Chinese emperors family tree (early) § Jin Dynasty and Chu
