= Changshan (disambiguation) =

Changshan (长衫) is a type of traditional Chinese dress.

Changshan may also refer to:

== Places ==
- Mount Chang or Changshan (常山), a former name of Mount Heng (Shanxi)
- Changshan County (常山县), of Quzhou City, Zhejiang
- Changshan Islands (长山岛), island group in the Bohai Sea off the coast of Shandong, under the administration of Changdao County
- Changshan Commandery (常山郡), a historical commandery in China

=== Towns (as 常山镇) ===
- Changshan, Huadian, Jilin, in Huadian City, Jilin

=== Towns (as 长山镇) ===
- Changshan, Qian Gorlos County, in Qian Gorlos Mongol Autonomous County, Jilin
- Changshan, Donggang, Liaoning, in Donggang City, Liaoning
- Changshan, Changdao County, in Changdao County, Shandong
- Changshan, Zouping County, in Zouping County, Shandong

=== Townships (as 长山乡) ===
- Changshan Township, Gannan County, in Gannan County, Heilongjiang
- Changshan Township, Suileng County, in Suileng County, Heilongjiang
- Changshan Township, Wuchang, Heilongjiang, in Wuchang City, Heilongjiang
- Changshan Township, Jinhua, in Wucheng District, Jinhua, Zhejiang

== People ==
- Princess Changshan, daughter of Sima Zhao

== Other uses ==
- Chángshān (常山), an herb used in Chinese traditional medicine

== See also ==
- Cheongsam, female Chinese dress
