= Wang Yuanji =

Jin Dynasty Empress Dowager (217–268)

Wang Yuanji 王元姬

Empress dowager of the Jin Dynasty
- Tenure: 9 February 266 – 20 April 268
- Successor: Yang Zhi
- Born: 217 (Note: The Jin Shu stated that Wang Yuanji died in the 4th year of the Tai'shi era (265–274) of the reign of Emperor Wu at the age of 52 (by East Asian age reckoning). By calculation, her birth year should be around 217. Note that Emperor Wu crowned himself emperor on the bing'yin day of the 12th month of the 1st year of the Tai'shi era, which corresponds to 8 Feb 266 in the Julian calendar.); Tancheng County, Shandong
- Died: 20 April 268 (aged 51); Luoyang, Henan
- Burial: Yanshi, Luoyang, Henan
- Spouse: Sima Zhao
- Issue Detail: Sima Yan; Sima Dingguo; Sima You; Sima Zhao; Sima Guangde; Princess Jingzhao
Names
- Family name: Wang (王); Given name: Yuanji (元姬)
Posthumous name
- Empress Wenming (文明皇后)
- House: House of Sima
- Father: Wang Su
- Mother: Lady Yang (羊氏) (Note: In 267, Lady Yang was posthumously conferred the title of xianjun (县君) and given the posthumous name "Jing" (靖); her full posthumous title was "Lady Jing of Pingyang" (平阳靖君). Also, it is unknown if Lady Yang was related to Yang Hu and Yang Huiyu.)

Wang Yuanji (Note: She should not be confused with her daughter-in-law who has a similar-sounding name and was the mother of Emperor Huai of Jin.) (217 – 20 April 268 (Note: According to Sima Yan's biography in Book of Jin, Wang Yuanji died on the wu'zi day of the 3rd month of the 4th year of the Tai'shi era of his reign. This corresponds to 20 Apr 268 on the Julian calendar.)) was a Chinese noble lady, aristocrat, and later empress dowager of the Jin dynasty, who lived in the state of Cao Wei during the Three Kingdoms period of China. She was the wife of Sima Zhao, a regent of Cao Wei. She became the empress dowager during the reign of her son Sima Yan, who ended the Wei regime and founded the Jin dynasty. She was posthumously honoured as "Empress Wenming" (Note: literally "civil and understanding empress"; her posthumous name is often used together with her surname (文明王皇后) to distinguish her from other empresses with the same posthumous name.) after her death.

She is known for her wisdom, good moral character, contributions to the origin and stabilization of the Jin dynasty, and for predicting Zhong Hui's rebellion in 264.

== Life ==
Wang Yuanji was from Tan County (郯縣), Donghai Commandery (東海郡), which is present-day Tancheng County, Shandong. Her father, Wang Su, served as a military officer in Wei and held a peerage as the Marquis of Lanling (蘭陵侯). Wang Yuanji would have eight brothers, of which at least three were younger than her: Wang Xun (王恂; 230s - 278), (Note: The Wei Jin Shiyu recorded that Wang Xun was in his 40s when he died.) Wang Qian (王虔) and Wang Kai (王恺). (Note: Wang Yuanji had another brother whose name was recorded: Wang Yun, who died between 256 and 263. Wang Su's biography in Sanguozhi recorded that Wang Yun inherited Wang Su's fiefdom and title when Su died in mid-or-late 256. However, Wang Yun died without issue and his fiefdom was allowed to lapse; Wang Xun was made Marquis of Lanling in c.263. It is likely, though not certain, that Lady Wang was older than Wang Yun.) Wang Yuanji also had at least one sister, who married Kuai Jun, son of Kuai Liang; Lady Wang's daughter later married Sun Xiu, grandson of Sun Kuang, after Sun Xiu surrendered to Jin.

When Wang Yuanji was eight years old (by East Asian reckoning), she already had a good memory and could recite the Confucian classics fluently. Once, when she was nine, her mother Lady Yang fell sick so she remained by her mother's side all the time to take care of her. She possessed savoir faire and performed well when her parents allowed her to manage household chores. Her grandfather Wang Lang doted on her and felt that she was extraordinary. He said,

"This girl will bring glory to our family. It's a pity that she isn't a boy!"

These words have also been interpreted as him lamenting her headstrong, tomboyish nature during her childhood. Her grandfather's words came true; years later, she contributed to the stabilization of a new dynasty and became empress.

When Wang Yuanji was 12 (by East Asian reckoning), her grandfather died and she cried her heart out. Her father respected her even more after that incident and felt that she was indeed very special.

=== Marriage ===
Wang Yuanji married Sima Zhao after reaching adulthood (around the age of 15) and bore him five sons – Sima Yan, Sima You, Sima Dingguo (司馬定國), Sima Zhao (司馬兆) and Sima Guangde (司馬廣德) – and a daughter who was historically known as Princess Jingzhao (京兆公主; literally "Princess of the Capital"). (Note: Princess Jingzhao was wedded to Zhen De after the latter's wife (a daughter of Sima Shi and thus Princess Jingzhao's cousin) died young. Zhen De was originally a male relative of Cao Rui's wife Empress Mingyuan. When Cao Rui's daughter Cao Shu died in 232, Guo De was declared to be Cao Shu's son. As Cao Shu was buried together with Zhen Huang, a deceased grandson of Lady Zhen's brother, Guo's surname was changed to "Zhen".) After her marriage, she maintained her good moral character and served her in-laws well. She cried her heart out again when her father died.

When Sima Zhao became the regent of Wei, he recognised Zhong Hui's talent and promoted the latter to higher appointments. Wang Yuanji told her husband, "Zhong Hui is a man who will forsake moral principles for his personal gains. He's likely to cause trouble if he's overly indulged and favoured. He shouldn't be entrusted with important responsibilities." Wang Yuanji's prediction came true later as Zhong Hui started a rebellion in March 264 after helping Wei conquer its rival state, Shu Han.

=== As empress dowager ===
Sima Zhao died in September 265 and was succeeded by his eldest son, Sima Yan, as the regent of Wei. In February 266, Sima Yan forced the last Wei ruler, Cao Huan, to abdicate in his favour, thereby ending the Wei regime and establishing the Jin dynasty. After ascending the throne, Sima Yan instated his mother as the empress dowager and gave her Chonghua Palace (崇化宮) as her residence, with Zhuge Xu as her Minister of the Guards (衛尉). Even after becoming the empress dowager, Wang Yuanji continued to live a humble and frugal life. There were no expensive furniture and decorations in her room; she kept her meals simple, wore old clothes again after washing them, and did her own weaving. She managed the imperial harem well and maintained harmony among Sima Yan's consorts.

Wang Yuanji died in April 268 at the age of 52 (by East Asian age reckoning). On her deathbed, while in tears, she told Emperor Wu, "Taofu (Note: Sima You's childhood name) is rash, while you are not benevolent as an elder brother. After my death, you two are unlikely to tolerate each other. Thus, I entrust him to you. Please don't forget my words." She was buried at Chongyangling (崇陽陵; somewhere in present-day Yanshi, Luoyang, Henan) with her husband. Sima Yan personally wrote a eulogy praising his mother's moral character and ordered a court historian to have it published.

== In popular culture ==
Wang Yuanji is first introduced as a playable character in the seventh instalment of Koei's Dynasty Warriors video game series. She has also made her appearance as a playable character in both Warriors Orochi 3 and Warriors Orochi 4, as well as in Warriors All-Stars. Her personality is portrayed as calm, cool, and collected, with a slight tendency to punish people who are lazy and out of order.

== See also ==
- Lists of people of the Three Kingdoms
- Family tree of Sima Yi#Sima Zhao
