= Cai Yan =

3rd-century Chinese poet and musician

- 蔡琰
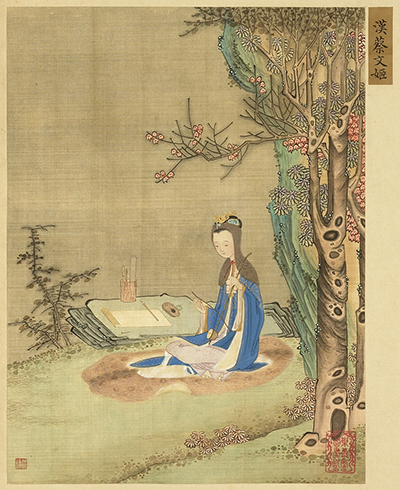
- A portrait of Cai Wenji in the album Gathering Gems of Beauty (畫麗珠萃秀)
- Born: c. 170 or 178; Qi County, Henan
- Died: later than 215, c. 249
- Other names: Wenji (文姬); Zhaoji (昭姫)
- Occupations: Composer, poet, writer
- Spouses: Wei Zhongdao; Wise Prince of the Left; Dong Si
- Children: at least two sons
- Father: Cai Yong
- Relatives: at least one sister; at least one brother; Yang Hu (nephew); Empress Jingxian (niece)

Cai Yan (c. 178 – post 206; or c. 170–215; or died c. 249), courtesy name Wenji, was a Chinese composer, poet, and writer who lived during the late Eastern Han dynasty of China. She was a daughter of Cai Yong. Her courtesy name was originally Zhaoji, but was changed to Wenji during the Jin dynasty to avoid naming taboo because the Chinese character for zhao in her courtesy name is the same as that in the name of Sima Zhao, the father of the Jin dynasty's founding emperor, Sima Yan. (Note: It remains unknown why Fan Ye, compiler of the Houhanshu, chose to record Lady Cai's courtesy name as "Wenji" even though he lived in the Liu Song dynasty, which didn't need to observe naming taboos concerning a previous dynasty. Within the same volume, Ban Zhao's name was recorded as-is, without any changes. One possibility was that by Fan's time, it was no longer possible to determine with certainty if her courtesy name was "Wenji" or "Zhaoji".) She spent part of her life as the concubine of a powerful Xiongnu leader until 207, when the warlord Cao Cao, who controlled the Han central government in the final years of the Eastern Han dynasty, paid a heavy ransom to bring her back to Han territory.

Cai Yan was celebrated for being "erudite, eloquent and brilliant in rhythm"; her biography was recorded in Book of the Later Han, volume 84: Biographies of Exemplary Women (卷八十四. 列女傳. 第七十四).

== Life ==
Cai Yan was a daughter of Cai Yong, a famous Eastern Han dynasty scholar from Yu County (圉縣), Chenliu Commandery (陳留郡), which is around present-day Qi County, Kaifeng, Henan. She was married to Wei Zhongdao (衛仲道) in 192 but her husband died shortly after their marriage and they did not have any children. Between 194 and 195, when China entered a period of chaos, the Xiongnu nomads intruded into Han territory, captured Cai, and took her back as a prisoner to the northern lands. During her captivity, she married the Xiongnu "Wise Prince of the Left" (possibly Liu Bao) and bore him two sons. 12 years later, the Chancellor of the Han, Cao Cao, asked for Cai's release in return for a huge ransom in the name of her father. Liu Bao agreed to these terms and freed Cai without hesitation. After her release, Cai returned to her homeland but left her children behind in Xiongnu territory. The reason Cao Cao wanted her back was that she was the sole surviving member of her clan and he needed her to placate the spirits of her ancestors.

After that, Cai married again, this time to Dong Si (董祀), a local government official from her hometown. However, when Dong Si committed a capital crime later, Cai pleaded with Cao Cao for her husband's acquittal. At the time, Cao Cao was hosting a banquet to entertain guests, who were stirred by Cai's distressed appearance and behaviour. She asked him if he could provide her with yet another husband. He pardoned Dong Si.

Later in her life, she wrote two poems describing her turbulent years.

== In Romance of the Three Kingdoms ==
Cai Yan briefly appears in chapter 71 of the novel, Romance of the Three Kingdoms, a historical novel of the 14th century which romanticizes events prior to and during the Three Kingdoms period of China.

Cao Cao was on a march to battle with Liu Bei during the Hanzhong Campaign when he passed by Cai Yan's residence.

Cao Cao came to the gates with a few attendants. Upon hearing who the guest was, Cai Yan hurriedly raced to meet them, and after Cao Cao took a seat in the household, he noticed a tablet which contained mix-matched eight words that he couldn't interpret. Cai Yan pointed out that her father wrote it after hearing a specific tale. Yang Xiu, one of the men whom Cao Cao brought along, declared he knew the riddle on the tablet.

Cao Cao and his subordinates later left the house and Yang Xiu mentioned what the eight words meant using wordplay.

== Legacy ==
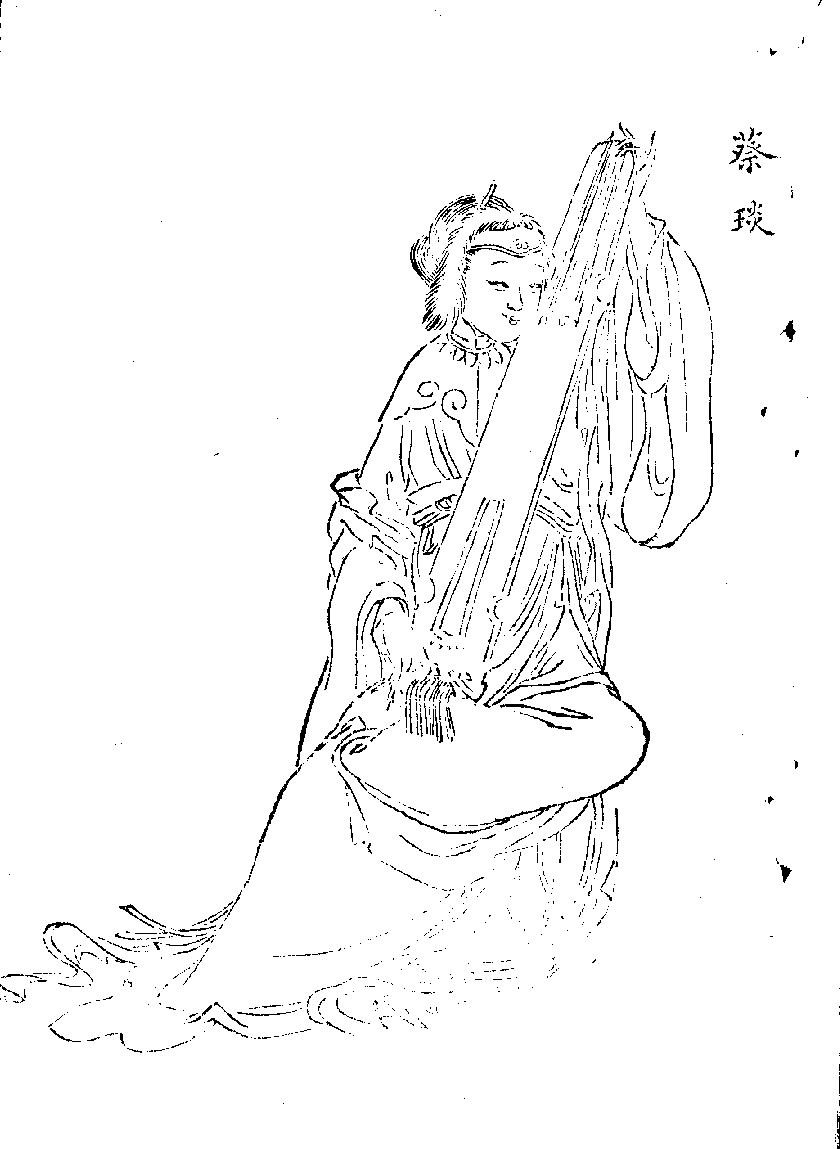
An illustration of Cai Wenji from a Qing dynasty collection of poems by female poets, 1772

Like her father, Cai Wenji was an established calligrapher of her time, and her works were often praised along with her father's. Her poems were noted for their sorrowful tone, which paralleled her hard life. The famous guqin piece Eighteen Songs of a Nomad Flute is traditionally attributed to her, although the authorship is a perennial issue for scholarly debate. The other two poems, both named "Poem of Sorrow and Anger" (悲憤詩), were known to be written by her.

The following is an excerpt from the "Poem of Sorrow and Anger" in five-character form (五言):

《悲憤詩》

Poem of Sorrow and Anger

處所多霜雪，胡風春夏起。

My dwelling is often covered by frost and snow,
The foreign winds bring again spring and summer;

翩翩吹我衣，蕭蕭入我耳。

They gently blow into my robes,
And chillingly shrill into my ear;

感時念父母，哀嘆無窮已。

Emotions stirred, I think of my parents,
Whilst I draw a long sigh of endless sorrows.

有客從外來，聞之常歡喜。

Whenever guests visit from afar,
I would often make joy of their tidings;

迎問其消息，輒復非鄉里。

I lost no time in throwing eager questions,
Only to find that the guests were not from my home town.

In addition to her surviving poems, a volume of Collective Works of Cai Wenji was known to have survived until as late as the Sui dynasty but had been lost by the Tang dynasty.

Cai Wenji inherited some 4,000 volumes of ancient books from her father's vast collection. However, they were destroyed in the ravages of war. At Cao Cao's request, Cai recited 400 of them from memory and wrote them on paper.

== Literary and artistic tributes ==
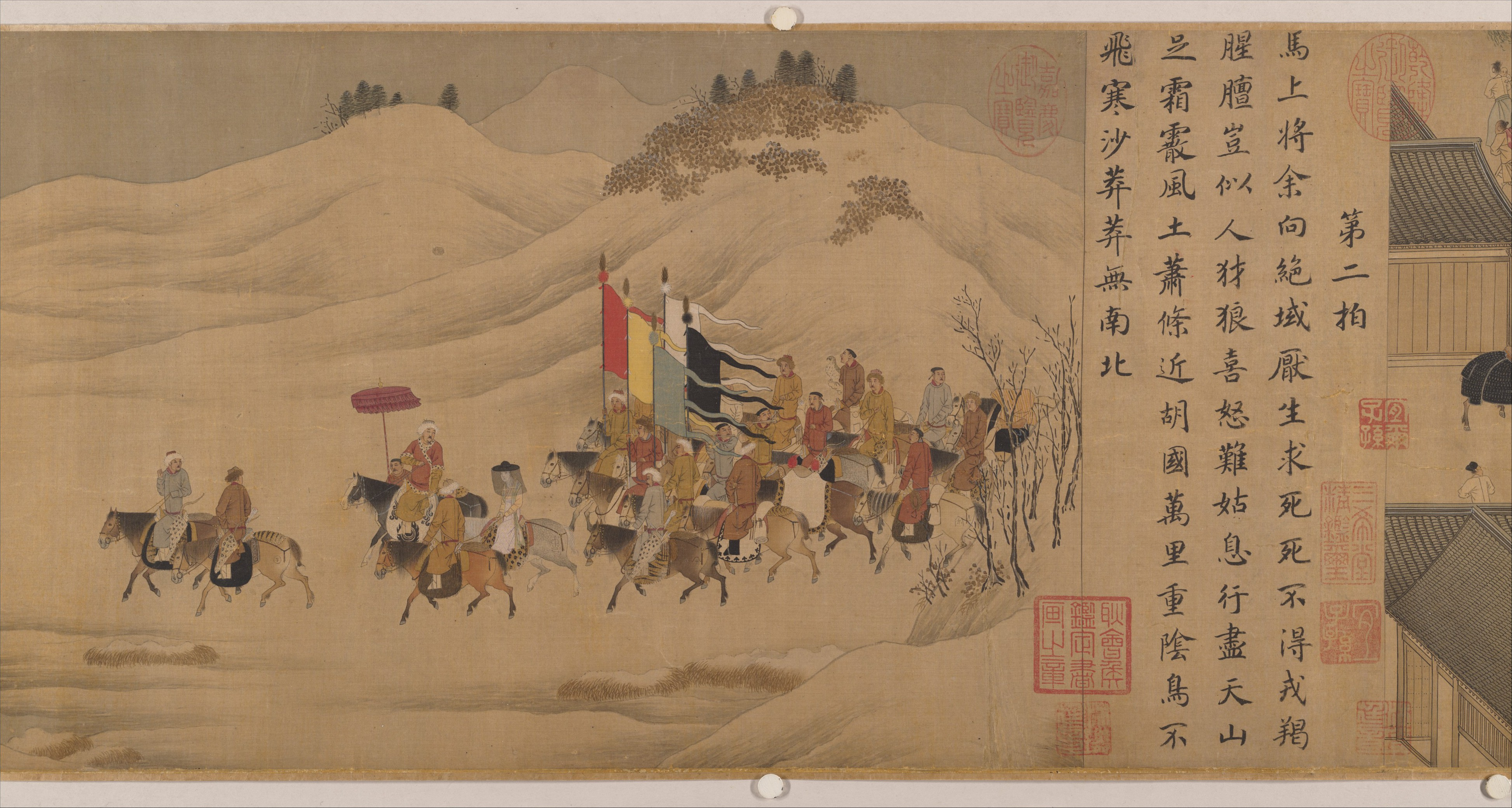
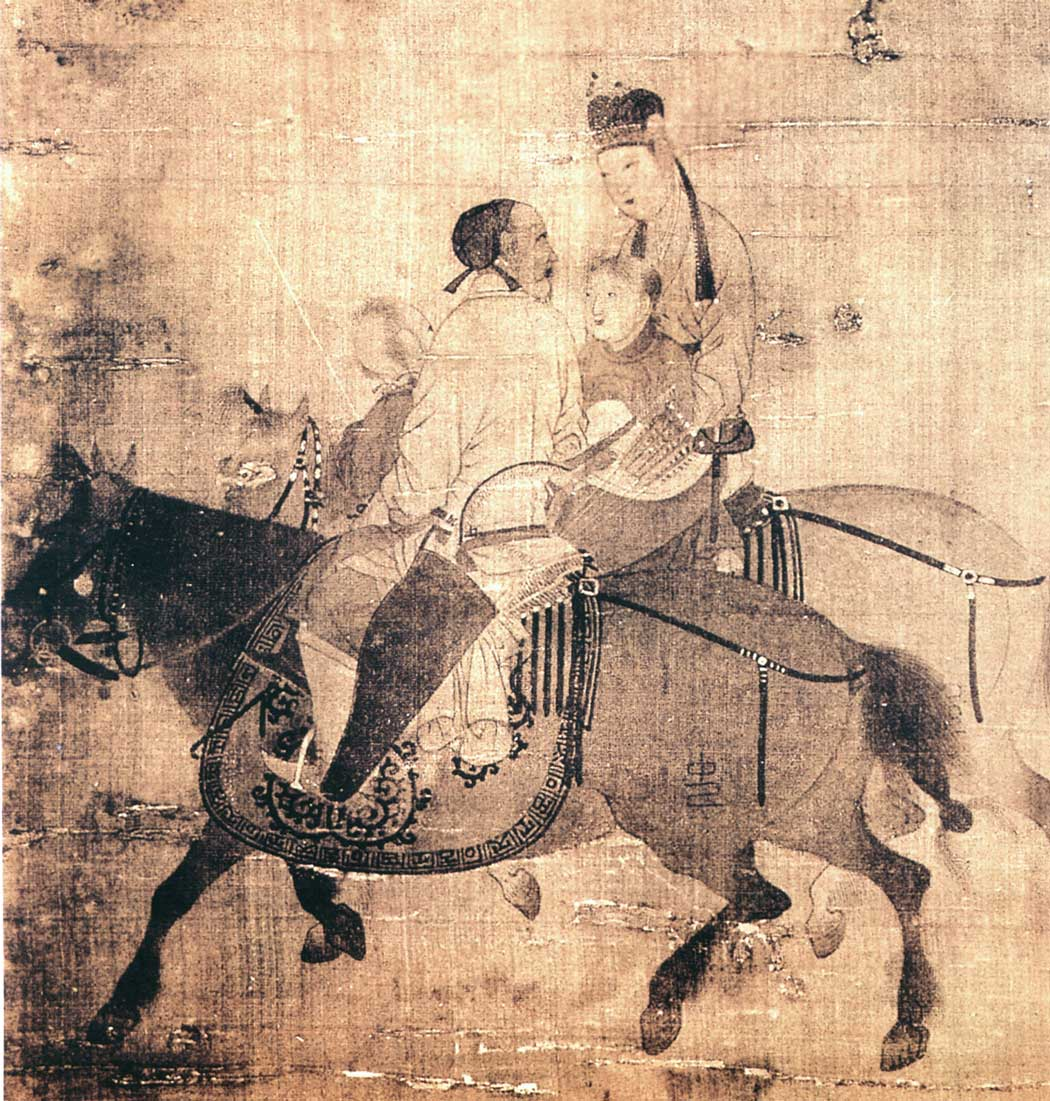
Left: Eighteen Songs of a Nomad Flute- The Story of Lady Wenji" a Ming dynasty painting in the collection of the Metropolitan Museum of Art depicting the return of Cai Wenji from the Xiongnu. Right:A portrait, Cai Wenji Returns to Her Homeland (文姬歸漢圖), dating from the Southern Song dynasty and depicting Cai Wenji and her Xiongnu husband. They are riding their horses along, each holding one of their sons. The expression on Cai's face appears rather fulfilled, peaceful and content, while her husband is turning his head back in farewell (transl. by Rong Dong).

The stories of Cai reverberate primarily with feelings of sorrow, and inspired later artists to keep portraying her past. Her return to Han territory has been the subject of numerous paintings titled Cai Wenji Returns to Her Homeland (文姬歸漢圖) by various painters since the Tang dynasty, as well as renderings in traditional Beijing opera.

== In popular culture ==
Guo Moruo wrote a play on her life in 1959. In 1976, a crater on Mercury was named Ts'ai Wen-Chi after Cai Wenji, citing her as "Chinese poet and composer". In 1994, a crater on Venus was named Caiwenji also after her, but with a different romanisation, citing her as "Chinese poet".

Cai Wenji appears as a playable character in Koei's Dynasty Warriors: Strikeforce 2 and Dynasty Warriors 7 (her debut as a playable character in North American and European ports). She also appears in Koei's Romance of the Three Kingdoms video game series and in Dynasty Warriors 6: Empires as a non-playable character. She is also a playable character in Warriors Orochi 3 and Warriors Orochi 4. Her fighting style relies on casting energy balls and shock waves by strumming her harp.

== See also ==
- Jian'an poetry
- Lists of people of the Three Kingdoms
