= Zhang Chunhua =

Chinese noblewoman and wife of Sima Yi (189–247)

Zhang Chunhua 張春華
- Born: 189 (Note: The Jin Shu recorded that Zhang Chunhua died in the 4th month of the 8th year of the Zhengshi era of Cao Fang's reign at the age of 59 (by East Asian age reckoning). This month corresponds to 22 May to 19 June 247 in the Gregorian calendar. By calculation, her year of birth year should be 189.); Pinggao County, Henei Commandery, Han Empire (present-day Wen County, Henan)
- Died: May or June 247 (aged 58)
- Burial: Yanshi, Luoyang, Henan
- Spouse: Sima Yi
- Issue Detail: Sima Shi; Sima Zhao; Sima Gan; Princess Nanyang
Names
- Family name: Zhang (張); Given name: Chunhua (春華)
Posthumous name
- Empress Xuanmu (宣穆皇后)
- House: House of Sima
- Father: Zhang Wang
- Mother: Lady Shan

Zhang Chunhua (189 – May or June 247) was a Chinese noble lady and aristocrat. She was the wife of Sima Yi, a prominent military general and regent of the state of Cao Wei during the Three Kingdoms period of China. She was posthumously honoured as Empress Xuanmu in 266 by her grandson Sima Yan, who ended the Cao Wei state and established the Jin dynasty that year.

== Life ==
Zhang Chunhua was from Pinggao County (平臯縣), Henei Commandery (河內郡), which is present-day Wen County, Henan. She was born in the late Eastern Han dynasty. Her father, Zhang Wang (張汪), served as the Prefect of Suyi County (粟邑縣) in the state of Cao Wei during the Three Kingdoms period. Her mother, whose maiden family name was "Shan" (山), was a grandaunt of Shan Tao, one of the Seven Sages of the Bamboo Grove. In her youth, Zhang Chunhua was already known for her good moral conduct, intelligence and wisdom.

Zhang Chunhua married Sima Yi and bore him three sons – Sima Shi, Sima Zhao and Sima Gan (司馬幹). She also bore him a daughter whose personal name was not recorded in history, but was historically known as Princess Nanyang (南陽公主) of the Jin dynasty. Princess Nanyang was the wife of Xun Yi, a grandson of Xun Yu. (Note: Xun Yu's biography in Sanguozhi recorded that his grandson Yi's wife was a younger sister of Sima Shi and Sima Zhao. (霬妻，司马景王、文王之妹也...) Sanguozhi, vol.10. In Eulogy to the Elder Princess of Nanyang (南阳长公主诔) by Pan Yue, Pan Yue mentioned the Xun family (言告言归，作合于荀。) Thus, it can be deduced that Princess Nanyang was the wife of Xun Yi.)

Sometime before 208, (Note: Sima Yi's biography in the Book of Jin mentioned that Cao Cao was still Minister of Works when this incident occurred. Since Cao Cao was only promoted to Imperial Chancellor in 208, this incident took place before 208.) when the warlord Cao Cao wanted to recruit him to serve in the government, Sima Yi lied that he suffered from paralysis and stayed at home. One day, while Sima Yi was drying his books under the sun, there was a sudden downpour, so he immediately rushed out to collect his books. One of his maids saw what happened. Zhang Chunhua was worried that the maid would leak out news that Sima Yi was well and get their family into trouble, so she killed the maid to silence her. She then personally prepared meals for the family. Sima Yi was very impressed with her.

In his later years, Sima Yi favoured his concubine Lady Bai (柏夫人; mother of Sima Lun) and started neglecting Zhang Chunhua. Once, when Sima Yi was ill, Zhang Chunhua visited him, and he said to her, "Old creature, your looks are disgusting! Why do you even bother to visit me?" Zhang Chunhua became angry and attempted to starve herself to death. Their sons did so too. Sima Yi was so shocked that he immediately apologised to his wife and reconciled with her. Sima Yi later secretly told someone, "It doesn't matter if that old creature died. I was actually worried about my boys!"

Zhang Chunhua died sometime between 22 May and 19 June 247 at the age of 59 (by East Asian age reckoning). She was buried at the Gaoyuan Mausoleum (高原陵; somewhere in present-day Yanshi, Luoyang, Henan). The Wei emperor Cao Fang granted her the posthumous title "Lady of Guangping County" (廣平縣君). In 264, during the reign of Cao Huan, she was given the posthumous name "Consort Xuanmu". In February 266, Sima Yi's grandson Sima Yan forced Cao Huan to abdicate in his favour and established the Jin dynasty to replace the state of Cao Wei. Sima Yan became emperor and he posthumously honoured his grandmother as "Empress Xuanmu".

== In popular culture ==
Zhang Chunhua is first introduced as a playable character in the eighth instalment of Koei's Dynasty Warriors video game series. She also appeared in the Hong Kong comic series The Ravages of Time by Chan Mou. (Note: Firstly as Shan Wuling (山無陵), an heir of the Shan family, which was historically the maternal side of Zhang Chunhua's family.) Liu Tao portrayed Zhang Chunhua in the 2017 Chinese television series The Advisors Alliance.

== See also ==
- Lists of people of the Three Kingdoms
- Family tree of Sima Yi#Sima Yi
