= Marquis of Lanling =

Marquis of Lanling may refer to:

- Wang Lang (Cao Wei) (died 228), Cao Wei politician
- Wang Su (Cao Wei) (195–256), Cao Wei politician and Wang Lang's son
