= Wang Su (Cao Wei) =

Cao Wei state official and scholar (195–256)

- 王肅

Minister of Ceremonies (太常)
- In office ? – 256
- Monarch: Cao Fang / Cao Mao

Intendant of Henan (河南尹)
- In office ?–?
- Monarch: Cao Fang

Administrator of Guangping (廣平太守)
- In office 240 – ?
- Monarch: Cao Fang

Personal details
- Born: 195
- Died: between 21 May 256 and 31 January 257 (Note: Wang Su's biography in the Sanguozhi recorded that he died in the 1st year of the Gan'lu era (256-260) in Cao Mao's reign. Also, in Cao Mao's biography, it was recorded that he visited the taixue on the bing'chen day of the 4th month of that year. During the visit, Wang Su replied to his queries. Thus, Wang Su must have died after the visit; the date corresponds to 21 May 256 in the Julian calendar. The year ends on 31 Jan 257 in the Julian calendar.) (aged 61)
- Spouse(s): Lady Yang (羊氏) (Note: Lady Yang was Wang Yuanji's mother. In 267, Lady Yang was posthumously conferred the title of xianjun (县君) and given the posthumous name "Jing" (靖); her full posthumous title was "Lady Jing of Pingyang" (平阳靖君). Also, it is unknown if Lady Yang was related to Yang Hu and Yang Huiyu.); Lady Xiahou (夏侯氏) (Note: Lady Xiahou was Wang Yuanji's stepmother. In 286, Lady Xiahou was posthumously conferred the title of "xiangjun of Xingyang" (荥阳乡君).)
- Children: Wang Yun (died between 256 and 263) (Note: Wang Su's biography in Sanguozhi recorded that Wang Yun inherited Wang Su's fiefdom and title when Su died in mid-or-late 256. However, Wang Yun died without issue and his fiefdom was allowed to lapse; Wang Xun was made Marquis of Lanling in c.263.); Wang Xun (230s-278); Wang Qian; Wang Kai (Note: Wang Kai was noted in Chinese history for his rivalry and competition in extravagance with Shi Chong; however, the Jin Zhu Gong Zan annotation recorded that Wang Kai and Shi Chong were friends.. Historical records did not indicate when Wang Kai was born or when he died; his elder brother Wang Xun was in his 40s when he died in 278. Wang Kai took part in overthrowing Yang Jun, and was rewarded with the title of Duke of Shandou County, with a fiefdom of 1,800 households. Thus, it is certain that he lived at least until the reign of Emperor Hui of Jin; his posthumous name was "Chou" (丑).); Wang Yuanji; Kuai Jun's wife (Note: A New Account of the Tales of the World recorded that after Sun Xiu (grandson of Sun Kuang) surrendered to Jin, Emperor Wu married a maternal aunt's daughter, Lady Kuai, to Sun. A Jin Yang Qiu annotation recorded that Lady Kuai was the daughter of Kuai Jun, son of Kuai Liang. However, the term yimei is ambiguous as it can also mean "wife's younger sister".); four other sons
- Parent: Wang Lang (father)
- Occupation: Official
- Courtesy name: Ziyong (子雍)
- Posthumous name: Marquis Jing (景侯)
- Peerage: Marquis of Lanling (蘭陵侯)

Wang Su (195–256), courtesy name Ziyong, was an official and Confucian scholar of the state of Cao Wei during the Three Kingdoms period of China. He was a son of Wang Lang, and was born in Kuaiji. In c.212, when Wang Su was 18 (by East Asian reckoning), he went to study the Taixuanjing under Song Zhong, and even wrote an annotation for the work.

When Guanqiu Jian started a rebellion in Shouchun, Wang Su advised Sima Shi to lower the rebels' morale by treating their families with respect. Following that, Wang Su entreated Cao Mao to allow Sima Zhao to succeed Sima Shi as regent of Wei.

Wang Su's daughter, Wang Yuanji, married Sima Zhao and gave birth to Sima Yan, the first emperor of the Jin dynasty, in 236. Thus, Wang Su became a grandfather himself. Wang Su inherited the title and marquisate of Marquis of Lanling (蘭陵侯) from his father.

Wang Su compiled the extant edition of the Kongzi Jiayu (School Sayings of Confucius), the sayings of Confucius not included in the Analects. Scholars long suspected it was a forgery by Wang Su, but a book discovered in 1977 from the Shuanggudui tomb (sealed in 165 BCE), entitled Ru Jia Zhe Yan (儒家者言, Sayings of the Ru School), contains very similar content to the Kongzi Jiayu.

== See also ==
- Lists of people of the Three Kingdoms
