= Sima You =

Jin dynasty imperial prince (248–283)

Sima You 司馬攸

Prince of Qi (齊王)
- Tenure: 9 February 266 – 27 April 283
- Predecessor: Cao Fang
- Successor: Sima Jiong
- Born: 246
- Died: 27 April 283 (aged 37)
- Spouse: Jia Bao (Note: Jia Chong's biography in Book of Jin recorded that Sima You and Jia Bao were wedded before Jia Chong was supposed to lead an army to guard the Guanzhong region and fend off attacks from Di and Qiang (氐羌) rebels in Sep 271.)
- Issue Detail: Sima Rui (司馬蕤); Sima Yu (司馬寔); Sima Zan (司馬贊); Sima Jiong (司馬冏)
Names
- Family name: Sima (司馬); Given name: You (攸); Courtesy name: Dayou (大猷); Childhood name: Taofu (桃符)
Posthumous name
- Prince Xian (獻王)
- House: House of Sima
- Father: Sima Zhao
- Mother: Wang Yuanji

Sima You (Chinese: 司馬攸; pinyin: Sīmǎ Yōu; 246 (Note: Although Sima You's biography in Book of Jin indicated that he was 36 (by East Asian reckoning) when he died, his biography also indicated that he was 10 (by East Asian reckoning) when Sima Shi died (in March 255). In addition, his biography also indicated that he was older than 18 (by East Asian reckoning) when the "five-rank peerage" system was reinstated (in 264), which would not be the case if his birth year is 248. Thus, his age at death should be greater than 36 (by East Asian reckoning).) – 27 April 283 (Note: According to Sima Yan's biography in Book of Jin, Sima You died on the guichou day of the 3rd month of the 4th year of the Taikang era of his reign. This corresponds to 27 Apr 283 on the Julian calendar. Vol.81 of Zizhi Tongjian recorded that You died in either the 3rd or 4th month of that year.)), courtesy name Dayou (大猷), posthumously known as Prince Xian of Qi (齐献王), was an imperial prince of the Western Jin dynasty of China. He was the second son of Sima Zhao, a regent of the Cao Wei state during the Three Kingdoms period, and Zhao's wife Wang Yuanji. His wife was a daughter of Jia Chong and Jia's first wife Li Wan; Li Wan herself was a daughter of Li Feng.

Sima You accompanied his grandfather Sima Yi as he put down Wang Ling's rebellion. He also became the heir to his uncle, Sima Shi, who eventually died in March 255 without any sons. It is known that Sima You was a person of mild-mannered character, who was expected to become King of Jin, but ended up being passed over due to his young age. (Note: There were some (e.g. Shan Tao) who advised Sima Zhao not to disinherit Sima Yan. Shan Tao's advice to Zhao was recorded in Zizhi Tongjian. Being chosen as heir due to his status as the eldest son of the main wife was one reason why Sima Yan did not disinherit Sima Zhong.) The heir that was eventually chosen was Sima Zhao's first son, Sima Yan (Emperor Wu), who usurped the Cao Wei throne and established the Jin dynasty with himself as the new emperor in February 266. Sima You was made Prince of Qi on 9 February 266. Empress Dowager Wang worried about Emperor Wu acting against Sima You; on her deathbed in April 268, while in tears, she told Emperor Wu, "Taofu is rash, while you are not benevolent as an elder brother. After my death, you two are unlikely to tolerate each other. Thus, I entrust him to you. Please don't forget my words."

After Emperor Wu appointed his developmentally disabled eldest son Sima Zhong heir apparent, he was concerned that his subjects viewed Sima You too favourably. One such incident occurred between August 272 and 274, (Note: According to the chronology of Jia Chong's biography in Book of Jin, the incident between him and Xiahou He took place after he was made sikong. According to Emperor Wu's biography in the same work, Jia Chong was made sikong in c.August 272; the month corresponds to 11 Aug to 9 Sep 272 in the Julian calendar. Vol.26 of the same work indicated that by 274, Xiahou He was already Minister of the Household. Thus, the incident must have happened between Aug 272 and 274. Vol.80 of Zizhi Tongjian dated this incident to 276 (2nd year of the Xian'ning era). While Emperor Wu's biography in Book of Jin did record that he was gravely ill in that year, if both Jin Shu and Tongjian were correct, it would mean that Xiahou He was first Minister of the Household in 274, then became Intendant of Henan before becoming Minister of the Household again after the incident.) while Xiahou He was still Intendant of Henan. Emperor Wu had become gravely ill, and the Jin court considered making Sima You the next emperor, rather than Sima Zhong. Xiahou told Jia Chong, "Your relations with both sons-in-law are equal. An heir should be chosen based on his virtues." Jia did not comment on the statement; after Emperor Wu heard about the incident, he moved Xiahou to the post of Minister of the Household, and deprived Jia of his military command, while allowing Jia to retain his titles and treatment in court. Despite this, Emperor Wu continued to bestow titles upon Sima You, including the post of sikong on 16 September 276, replacing Jia Chong (who was made Grand Commandant).

In order to strengthen Sima Zhong's position, he ordered Sima You away from Luoyang in January 283 (Note: Emperor Wu's biography in Book of Jin recorded that Sima You was made da sima, Great General who Stabilizes the East, and overall in charge of military affairs concerning Qingzhou on 28 January 283. This was also the last entry to mention You before his death in April that year.) to his fiefdom of Qi, despite protestations from their sisters, Princess Jingzhao and Princess Changshan. (Note: vol.42 (biography of Wang Ji, husband of Princess Changshan)) With his father-in-law Jia Chong having died a few months earlier in May 282, Sima You had one fewer powerful voice to intercede on his behalf. Sima You fell ill from the stress and died soon after in April 283 at the age of 38 (by East Asian age reckoning). (Note: vol.03 (Chronicles of Emperor Wu)) Emperor Wu decreed that the funeral rites for You's funeral follow those of their great-uncle, Sima Fu.

Sima You's son, Sima Jiong, was one of the eight princes involved in the War of the Eight Princes during the reign of Emperor Hui, the second emperor of the Jin dynasty.

== Notes ==
Prince of Qi House of Sima Born: 246 Died: 283
Chinese royalty
Preceded by Cao Fang	Prince of Qi; February 266–April 283	Succeeded by Sima Jiong
