= Xiahou Hui (Sima Shi's wife) =

Cao Wei noblewoman and wife of Sima Shi (211-234)

Xiahou Hui 夏侯徽
- Born: 211
- Died: 234 (aged 23)
- Spouse: Sima Shi
- Issue Detail: five daughters
Names
- Family name: Xiahou (夏侯); Given name: Hui (徽); Courtesy name: Yuanrong (媛容)
Posthumous name
- Empress Jinghuai (景懷皇后)
- House: House of Sima
- Father: Xiahou Shang
- Mother: Lady Cao

Xiahou Hui (211 – May or June 234? (Note: Sanguozhi and Zizhi Tongjian both recorded that there was an epidemic in the 4th month of the 2nd year of the Qing'long era of Cao Rui's reign. This corresponds to 16 May to 14 Jun 234 in the Julian calendar. As the anecdote of Lady Xiahou being poisoned to death can be considered doubtful, it is probably more likely that Lady Xiahou died during this epidemic.)), courtesy name Yuanrong, formally known as Empress Jinghuai, was a noble lady of the state of Cao Wei during the Three Kingdoms period of China. She was a clever adviser to Sima Shi; it is said that she was poisoned by her husband due to conflicting loyalties.

== Life ==
Xiahou Hui was a daughter of Xiahou Shang, a military general of the Cao Wei state in the Three Kingdoms period. Her mother was the Lady of Deyang District (德陽鄉主), a sister of the Wei general Cao Zhen; her full brother was Xiahou Xuan. At some point, (Note: It is unknown if the marriage took place during Cao Pi's or Cao Rui's reign.) she married Sima Shi, who would eventually become the regent of the Cao Wei state from 251 to 255. She bore Sima Shi five daughters but no sons. She was an elegant and intelligent woman who helped Sima Shi with his scholarship and his strategies. However, she eventually realised that her husband was not loyal to Wei; Sima Shi too became wary of her, due to her familial ties with the royal Cao clan of Wei. In 234, Xiahou Hui died after being poisoned. (Note: In his Zizhi Tongjian Kaoyi (资治通鉴考异), Sima Guang expressed his skepticism of this account. He argued that at this point, Sima Yi had just earned Cao Rui's trust, and showed no signs of disloyalty; his sons had no reasons to be disloyal as well. Thus, he didn't include this account in Zizhi Tongjian.)

After the Jin dynasty replaced the Cao Wei state, the first Jin ruler Sima Yan (Emperor Wu), a nephew of Sima Shi, honoured Xiahou Hui with the posthumous title "Empress Jinghuai" to match Sima Shi's posthumous title of "Emperor Jing".

== See also ==
- Lists of people of the Three Kingdoms
- Family tree of Sima Yi#Sima Shi
