= Cai Yong =

Chinese official and scholar (132–192)

- 蔡邕
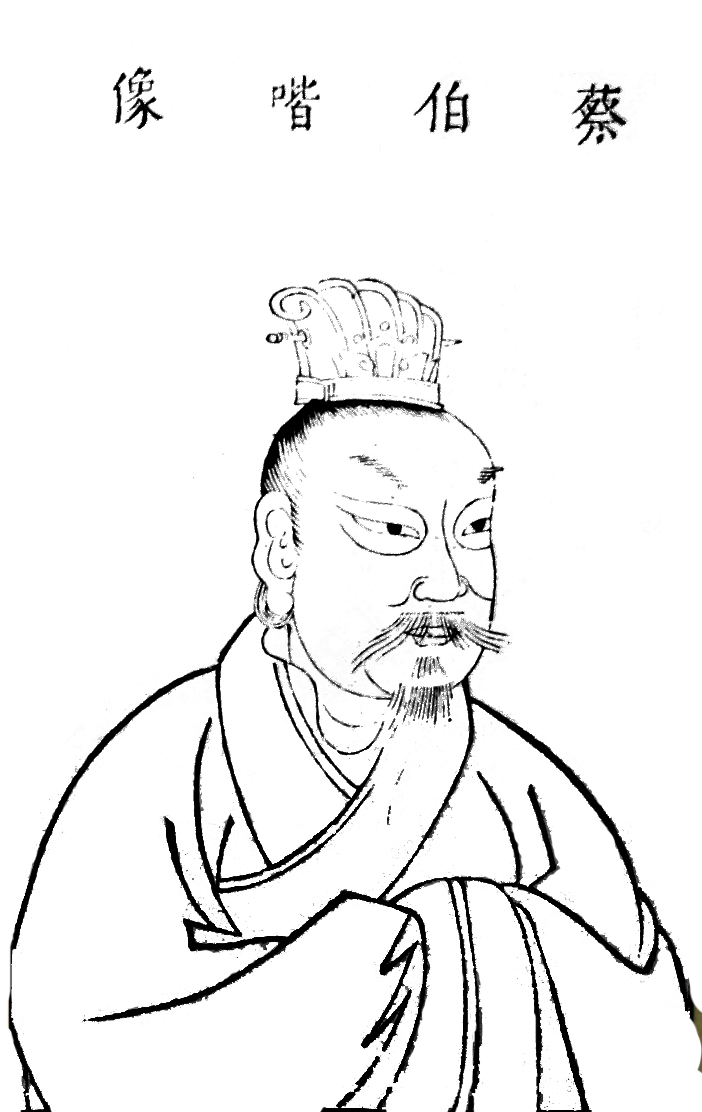
- Portrait of Cai Yong in Sancai Tuhui

Left General of the Household (左中郎將)
- In office 189 – 192
- Monarch: Emperor Xian of Han
- Chancellor: Dong Zhuo

Personal details
- Born: 132 Qi County, Kaifeng, Henan
- Died: c.June 192 (aged 60) Xi'an, Shaanxi
- Children: Cai Yan; at least one other daughter; at least one son
- Parent: Cai Leng (father)
- Relatives: Cai Xi (grandfather); Cai Zhi (uncle); Yang Hu (grandson); Empress Jingxian (granddaughter); Cai Xi (grandson); at least two other grandsons
- Occupation: Astronomer, calligrapher, historian, mathematician, musician, politician, writer
- Courtesy name: Bojie (伯喈)
- Peerage: Marquis of Gaoyang District (高陽鄉候)

Cai Yong
- Chinese: 蔡邕
Transcriptions
Standard Mandarin
- Hanyu Pinyin: Cài Yōng
- Gwoyeu Romatzyh: Tsay Iong
- Wade–Giles: Ts'ai^{4} Yung^{1}
- IPA: [tsʰâɪ jʊ́ŋ]
Yue: Cantonese
- Yale Romanization: Choi Yūng
- Jyutping: Coi^{3} Jung^{1}
- IPA: [tsʰɔj˧ jʊŋ˥]
Southern Min
- Tâi-lô: Tshuà Iong

Cai Yong (132/133 – c. June 192), courtesy name Bojie, was a Chinese astronomer, calligrapher, historian, mathematician, musician, politician, and writer of the Eastern Han dynasty. He was well-versed in calligraphy, music, mathematics and astronomy. One of his daughters, Cai Yan / Cai Wenji, was also a famous poet and musician.

== Early life ==
Cai Yong was born in a substantial local family in Yu County (圉縣), Chenliu Commandery (陳留郡), which is around present-day Qi County, Kaifeng, Henan. The Cai family had a reputation of not having their territory divided for three generations. When his father Cai Leng (蔡棱) died, Cai Yong lived with his uncle Cai Zhi (蔡質) while taking great care for his own mother for her last three years. When she died, Cai Yong became known for his arrangement of his mother's tomb. After that, Cai Yong studied composition, mathematics, astronomy, pitch-pipes and music under Hu Guang (胡廣), one of the highest-ranking officials in the Han imperial court.

== Service under Emperor Ling ==
In the early 160s, Cai Yong was recommended to Emperor Huan (r. 146–168) by the senior eunuchs for his skill with the drums and the guqin. On his way to the capital, Cai Yong feigned illness to return home to study in seclusion. Ten years later in the early 170s, Cai Yong served as a clerk under the official Qiao Xuan, who greatly admired his abilities. Afterwards, Cai Yong served as a county magistrate and then a Consultant in the capital, in charge of editing and collating the text in the library. Known for his literary skills, he was constantly commissioned to write eulogies, memorial inscriptions, and the like.

In 175, in fear of parties trying to alter the Confucian classics to support their views, Cai Yong and a group of scholars petitioned to have the Five Classics engraved in stone. Emperor Ling (r. 168–189) approved, and the result was the Xiping Stone Classics completed in 183, which set the canon for future generations of scholars.

Throughout his political career, he was an advocate of restoring ceremonial practices and often criticised against the eunuchs' influence in politics. He was successful in persuading the emperor to participate in a ritual in the winter of 177 through his memorials, but his attacks on the eunuchs were not so successful.

In the autumn of 178, the scholars were asked for advice on recent ill omens. Cai Yong responded with criticisms of eunuch pretensions. The eunuchs learnt of the attack, and accused Cai Yong and his uncle Cai Zhi of extortion. They were thrown into prison and sentenced to death, but the sentence was later remitted to exile in the northern frontiers. Nine months later, he cited to the throne that his work on the dynastic history and classics were at risk from enemy raids, and was allowed back to the capital. However, he offended the sibling of an influential eunuch during a farewell banquet before his return, which put his position in the capital at risk. Cai Yong fled south to Wu (吳) and Kuaiji commanderies and stayed there for 12 years.

== Service under Dong Zhuo ==
When the warlord Dong Zhuo came to power in 189 and controlled the central government, he summoned Cai Yong back to the imperial capital Luoyang. At first Cai Yong was unwilling, but Dong Zhuo enforced his demand with the threat "I can eliminate whole clans", Cai Yong had no choice but to comply. Under Dong Zhuo, Cai Yong was appointed Left General of the Household, and became in charge of revising rituals for Dong Zhuo's new government. Despite Dong Zhuo's admiration of Cai Yong as a scholar and musician, Cai Yong worried about Dong Zhuo's temper and once considered to return home, but was persuaded that he was too well known to escape.

In May 192, when Dong Zhuo was killed in a plot by Wang Yun, Cai Yong was put into prison and sentenced to death for allegedly expressing grief at Dong Zhuo's death. Cai Yong and other government officials pleaded with Wang Yun to allow him to finish his work on the history of Han, but Wang Yun denied them, saying:

"In ancient times, Emperor Wu failed to kill Sima Qian, and so allowed him to write a book of slander which was passed down to later times. Particularly at this time, as the fortunes of the Emperor are in decline and there are war-horses in the suburbs, we cannot allow a treacherous minister to hold his brush among the attendants to a young emperor. It offers no advantage to the sage virtue of the ruler, and it will cause our party to suffer contempt and abuse."

It was said that Wang Yun eventually regretted this decision, but Cai Yong had already died in prison. After his death, pictures were set up in his honour, and commemorative eulogies were composed throughout Chenliu Commandery and Yan Province.

== Works ==
Due to the turmoil in China in the decade after Cai Yong's death, many of his works were lost. However, Cai Yong had apparently entrusted the bulk of his library to his protégé, Wang Can, and it is through Wang Can's collection that Cai Yong's works can be found in compilations like the Book of Later Han. A few of his works survive today.

His contributions include:

- The editing of the Xiping Stone Classics
- The compilation of Dongguan Hanji (東觀漢記)
- Duduan (獨斷) on ceremonial
- Cai Yong bencao (蔡邕本草) on pharmacology
- Nü Xun (女訓), advice for women
- Qin Cao (琴操) on playing the guqin
- Zhuan shi (篆勢) on the aspects of the traditional seal script

== Family ==
- Grandfather: Cai Xi (蔡攜)
- Father: Cai Leng (蔡棱)
- Uncle: Cai Zhi (蔡質)
- Children:
  - Cai Yan (Wenji), daughter
  - Daughter, personal name unknown, married to Yang Dao (羊衜)
  - Son, personal name unknown
- Grandchildren:
  - Cai Xi (蔡襲), grandson
  - Yang Huiyu, maternal granddaughter
  - Yang Hu, maternal grandson

== In fiction ==
Cai Bojie is the main protagonist in the 14th-century play Tale of the Pipa by Gao Ming.

== See also ==
- Lists of people of the Three Kingdoms
