= Yang Huiyu =

Jin dynasty empress dowager (214–278)

Yang Huiyu 羊徽瑜

Empress dowager of the Jin Dynasty
- Tenure: 266–278
- Born: 214
- Died: 278 (aged 64)
- Spouse: Sima Shi
Posthumous name
- Empress Jingxian (景獻皇后)
- Father: Yang Chai or Yang Dao
- Mother: Lady Cai

Yang Huiyu (214 (Note: According to Lady Yang's biography in Book of Jin, she was 65 (By East Asian reckoning) when she died. Thus by calculation, her birth year should be 214.) – c.July 278 (Note: According to Sima Yan's biography in Book of Jin, Lady Yang died in the 6th month of the 4th year of the Xian'ning era of his reign. The month corresponds to 7 Jul to 5 Aug 278 on the Julian calendar.)), formally known as Empress Jingxian, semi-formally known as Empress Dowager Hongxun (弘訓太后), was an empress dowager of the Jin dynasty of China. She was the third wife of Sima Shi, a regent of the Cao Wei state in the Three Kingdoms period. Her father, Yang Chai (羊茝), (Note: This name appeared in Lady Yang's biography in volume 31 of Jin Shu. Yang Hu's biography in volume 34 of Jin Shu listed their father's name as Yang Dao (羊衜).) (Note: Her grandfather Yang Xu has a biography in vol.31 of Book of the Later Han.) was the commandery administrator of Shangdang, while her mother was a daughter of the Han dynasty historian and musician Cai Yong. Her younger full brother was Yang Hu, a military general who served under the Jin dynasty.

== Life ==
In 234, Sima Shi's first wife Xiahou Hui died. Later, Sima Shi married another noblewoman (Note: a daughter of Wu Zhi), but he soon divorced her. He eventually married Yang Huiyu, because she was a politicized, talented, intelligent and generous woman.

Yang Huiyu did not have any sons with Sima Shi – who did not have any sons with his prior wives or concubines either. As a result, his brother Sima Zhao became the regent after his death in 255. After Sima Zhao's death ten years later, his son Sima Yan usurped the throne from the last Cao Wei emperor Cao Huan and established the Jin dynasty in February 266. In recognition of his uncle's contribution, he honoured Yang Huiyu as an empress dowager in 266 and housed her in Hongxun Palace (Note: Hence, Lady Yang was semi-formally known as Empress Dowager Hongxun.). It was said that it was at her insistence that Emperor Wu also posthumously honoured Sima Shi's first wife, Xiahou Hui, as Empress Jinghuai. She died in c.July 278 at the age of 65 (by East Asian age reckoning) and was buried with honours due an empress beside Sima Shi on 27 August 278.

== See also ==
- Lists of people of the Three Kingdoms
