= Princess Changshan =

Daughter of Emperor Wen of Jin

Princess Changshan 常山公主
- Born: Unknown
- Died: Unknown
- Spouse: Wang Ji
Names
- Family name: Sima (司馬); Given name: Unknown
- House: Sima
- Father: Sima Zhao

Princess Changshan is the formal title of a daughter of the regent of the state of Cao Wei, Sima Zhao. Her personal name is unknown.

== Biography ==
Princess Changshan is recorded as having been blind in both eyes, though it is unclear from the texts whether this was congenital or developed over time. She was the sister of Emperor Wu of Jin and the primary wife of the official Wang Ji (王濟; son of Wang Hun), who is recorded as having greatly favoured her.

When Emperor Wu of Jin ordered their brother, the Prince of Qi, from the capital Luoyang to his fiefdom in January 283 CE, Princess Changshan petitioned the emperor to allow him to stay. She was joined by her half-sister, the Princess Jingzhao. The emperor was furious and scolded Wang Ji for having sent women to cry in front of him. He demoted Wang for lacking in filial piety.

Princess Changshan had no sons, but was considered the formal mother of Wang's two sons by his concubines. While the eldest son inherited the rank of Wang's father, the second son Wang Yu (Chinese: 王聿) inherited Princess Changshan's rank and received the title Marquis Minyang (Chinese: 敏陽候).

== See also ==
- Women in ancient and imperial China
