= Yang Hu =

Chinese Cao Wei official and Jin dynasty general (221–278)

- 羊祜
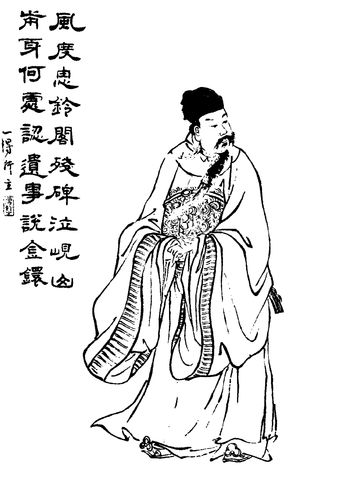
- A Qing dynasty illustration of Yang Hu as depicted in the Wu Shuang Pu (無雙譜, Table of Peerless Heroes) by Jin Guliang

Senior General Who Attacks the South (征南大將軍)
- In office c. December 276 – 27 December 278
- Monarch: Emperor Wu of Jin

General Who Pacifies the South (平南將軍)
- In office 275? – c. December 276
- Monarch: Emperor Wu of Jin

General of Chariots and Cavalry (車騎將軍)
- In office c. August 272 (Note: The annals of Emperor Wu in Book of Jin recorded that the previous General of Chariots and Cavalry was Jia Chong and he held the post from 9 February 266 to c. August 272, where he was made Minister of Works. The annals also recorded that Yang was General of Chariots and Cavalry by the 9th month of that year, which corresponds to 9 Oct to 7 Nov 272 in the Julian calendar.) – ?
- Monarch: Emperor Wu of Jin

Personal details
- Born: 221 (Note: Sima Yan's biography in the Jin Shu recorded that Yang Hu died on the xinmao day of the 11th month of the 4th year of the Xian'ning era of Sima Yan's reign. This date corresponds to 27 December 278 in the Gregorian calendar. Yang Hu's biography in the Jin Shu also recorded that he was 58 years old (by East Asian age reckoning) when he died. By calculation, Yang Hu's year of birth should be 221.)
- Died: 27 December 278 (aged 57)
- Spouse: Xiahou Ba's daughter
- Parents: Yang Dao (father); Lady Cai (mother)
- Relatives: Yang Fa (brother); Yang Cheng (brother); Empress Jingxian (elder sister); Xin Xianying (aunt); Cai Yong (maternal grandfather); Cai Yan (aunt)
- Occupation: Military general, politician
- Courtesy name: Shuzi (叔子)
- Peerage: Marquis of Juping (鉅平侯)

Yang Hu (羊祜, 221 – 27 December 278), courtesy name Shuzi, was a Chinese military general and politician who lived during the Cao Wei and Jin dynasties of China. His advocacy for plans to conquer the rival state of Eastern Wu finally persuaded Emperor Wu to carry them out, but he did not live to see the plans implemented. He was known for his humility and foresight. The Book of Jin described him as a man of medium height with fine eyebrows and a beautiful beard. Yang Hu is depicted in the Wu Shuang Pu (無雙譜, Table of Peerless Heroes) by Jin Guliang.

== Life ==
Both Yang Hu's grandfather Yang Xu (羊續) (Note: Yang Xu has a biography in vol.31 of Book of the Later Han.) and father Yang Dao (羊衜) (Note: Yang Huiyu's biography in vol.31 of Book of Jin gave their father's name as Yang Chai (羊茝).) were commandery administrators (of Nanyang and Shangdang respectively), and his mother was a daughter of the Han dynasty historian and musician Cai Yong. His full elder sister Yang Huiyu was Sima Shi's third wife, subsequently honoured as an empress dowager after Emperor Wu established the Jin dynasty in February 266.

Yang Hu lost his father at age 11. He was raised by his uncle Yang Dan (羊耽) (Note: Yang Dan was also a great-grandfather of Yang Xianrong.) and served his uncle faithfully. As he matured, he became known for his intelligence, knowledge, and physical beauty. The general Xiahou Wei became impressed with him and married his niece (Xiahou Ba's daughter) to Yang Hu. After his father-in-law defected to Shu Han in 249 in light of Sima Yi's coup against Cao Shuang, Yang Hu was one of the few who were related by marriage who still dared to associate with the Xiahou clan. He served as a low level official during the reigns of the Cao Wei emperors Cao Mao and Cao Huan.

Due to the advice of his aunt, Xin Xianying, Yang Hu raised his status. He warned Sima Zhao of Zhong Hui's intentions, and Sima Zhao trusted his judgement greatly after Zhong Hui rebelled (as he predicted) in March 264. After this, he went on to serve as an executive secretary for Sima Zhao.

After Sima Zhao's death in September 265, his son Sima Yan succeeded him, and in February of the following year forced Cao Huan to abdicate in favour of him, ending Cao Wei and establishing the Jin dynasty (as Emperor Wu). Emperor Wu wanted to make Yang Hu a duke, but the latter declined.

Throughout the early part of Emperor Wu's reign, Yang Hu was one of the few key officials who strenuously advocated for the conquest of the rival state Eastern Wu. Emperor Wu, who liked the strategies that Yang Hu submitted, had him take charge of the western border with Eastern Wu and stationed him at Xiangyang. In 272, Yang Hu participated in a failed mission to rescue the Eastern Wu defector Bu Chan from Xiling (西陵; in present-day Yichang, Hubei), (Note: During the Battle of Xiling, Wang Rong was nearly executed by Yang for violating military law.) and was temporarily demoted, but was soon restored to his rank. After that defeat, he set up a détente with the Eastern Wu general Lu Kang and treated the Eastern Wu border residents with kindness, with intent to win over their loyalty. His efforts succeeded, though Lu Kang attempted to counter with his own gestures of goodwill. After Lu Kang's death in c.September 274, the Eastern Wu border residents became increasingly impressed with the Jin dynasty in light of Yang Hu's kindness.

By 277, Yang Hu had fallen ill. While his plans of conquest had already been submitted and accepted by Emperor Wu, they were not ready for implementation. He performed his final act in the service of the empire – by recommending the capable Du Yu to succeed him. Du Yu would eventually go on to be a major part of the campaign against Eastern Wu. He died in December 278, just a few months after his elder sister Yang Huiyu. The people of Xiangyang built a monument for Yang Hu on Mount Xian (峴山), and ever after Yang Hu's death, visitors to the monument often wept in memory of his benevolent governance, and so the monument became known as the "Monument of Tears" (墮淚碑). After the Jin dynasty conquered Eastern Wu in May 280, Emperor Wu had the declaration of victory read at Yang Hu's shrine, and awarded his wife, Lady Xiahou, an estate of over 5,000 taxable households in appreciation.

== See also ==
- Lists of people of the Three Kingdoms

== Sources ==
- Chen Shou (1959) [280s or 290s]. Records of the Three Kingdoms. Beijing: Zhonghua Shuju. Cited as Sanguozhi.
- Fang Xuanling; et al., eds. (1974) [648]. Book of Jin 晉書. Beijing: Zhonghua Shuju. Cited as Jin Shu.
- Killigrew, John W. (2003). "The Reunification of China in AD 280: Jin's Conquest of Eastern Wu". Early Medieval China. 2003 (1): 1–34. doi:10.1179/152991003788138438. S2CID 162275334.
- Chen Shou (1977) [429]. Pei Songzhi (ed.). Annotated Records of the Three Kingdoms 三國志注. Taipei: Dingwen Printing. Cited as Sanguozhi zhu.
- Sima Guang, ed. (1934) [1084]. Zizhi Tongjian 資治通鑑. Hong Kong: Zhonghua Shuju.
