= Sima (office) =

Ancient Chinese military office

- Traditional Chinese: 司馬
- Simplified Chinese: 司马
Transcriptions
Standard Mandarin
- Hanyu Pinyin: sīmǎ

Sima is an official post from ancient China that first appears in texts dating from the Western Zhou dynasty and continued to be used during the Spring and Autumn period and Warring States period. Translated literally, it means "administrator of the horses." Since the power and responsibilities associated with the office changed somewhat throughout Chinese history, a variety of English translations for the term have been suggested. The textually closest equivalent is Master of the Horse. Other English terms such as 'marshal' and 'major' have also been suggested, and may be appropriate in different contexts: for example 'marshal' may be appropriate in the Western Han dynasty, when "Grand Sima" was a title granted to high generals, while 'major' may be appropriate as the translation for the lower military position also called "Sima" from the Wei dynasty to the Song dynasty.

During the Eastern Han dynasty the term 'Grand Marshal' (Chinese: 大司馬; pinyin: dàsīmǎ) came to mean Minister of War, one of the Three Ducal Ministers serving directly under the emperor. In so doing it replaced the term 'Grand Commandant' (Chinese: 太尉; pinyin: tàiwèi) which was used during the Western Han. This term had likewise replaced 'Grand Protector' (Chinese: 太保; pinyin: tàibǎo), an even older term for the office which had been used during the Zhou dynasty. This usage ended when Cao Cao eliminated the Three Ducal Ministers and replaced them with the position of Imperial Chancellor in 208 AD. The office is the origin of the surname Sima.

== See also ==
- Government of the Han dynasty
- Translation of Han dynasty titles
