= Wu Zhi =

Cao Wei state official and general (178–230)

- 吳質

Palace Attendant (侍中)
- In office 230
- Monarch: Cao Rui

General Who Inspires Might (振威將軍)
- In office ? – 230
- Monarch: Cao Pi / Cao Rui

North General of the Household (北中郎將)
- In office 220 – ?
- Monarch: Cao Pi

Prefect of Yuancheng (元城令)
- In office ?–?
- Monarch: Emperor Xian of Han

Chief of Zhaoge (朝歌長)
- In office ?–?
- Monarch: Emperor Xian of Han

Personal details
- Born: 178 Dingtao County, Shandong
- Died: 230
- Children: Wu Ying; Sima Shi's second wife
- Occupation: Official, general
- Courtesy name: Jizhong (季重)
- Posthumous name: Marquis Wei (威侯)

Wu Zhi (178 — 230), courtesy name Jizhong, was an official and military general of the state of Cao Wei during the Three Kingdoms period of China. (Note: In the original Sanguozhi, Chen Shou only wrote a few words for Wu Zhi's biography. In his annotations, Pei Songzhi greatly expanded on Wu Zhi's biography using sources such as Wei Jin Shiyu (Shiyu) and Weilüe.)

== Life ==
Wu Zhi was born in a poor family in Jiyin Commandery (濟陰郡), which is around present-day Dingtao County, Shandong. He became a close aide of Cao Pi, the eldest surviving son of the warlord Cao Cao, who controlled the Han central government and the figurehead Emperor Xian in the late Eastern Han dynasty. During this time, he served as the Chief (長) of Zhaoge County (朝歌縣) and Prefect (令) of Yuancheng County (元城縣).

Wu Zhi helped Cao Pi in his rivalry against his brother, Cao Zhi, for the right to succeed their father. In 214, Cao Cao was departing on campaign, and Cao Zhi made a splendid speech, full of praise for his father’s achievements and virtues. Everyone admired him, and Cao Pi felt quite at a loss, but his friend Wu Zhi whispered, “As the king is about to leave, weep,” Cao Pi followed his advice, shedding tears as he bowed in farewell, and all in attendance wept in sympathy. Some now felt that though Cao Zhi was a fine orator, he lacked true feeling. In 215, after Wu Zhi had taken up a post in Henei, Cao Pi turned to him again for support and advice, and Wu Zhi returned to see him at Ye city, hidden in a basket in a cart. This was quite against regulations, and Yang Xiu found out and reported the offence to Cao Cao. Though Cao Cao did not investigate immediately, Cao Pi was seriously worried. Wu Zhi reassured him, however, and on the follow- ing day he had another load sent in, this time with a basket of silk. The guards inspected it but found nothing untoward, so Cao Pi was cleared and Cao Cao began to have doubts about Yang Xiu.

In 220, following Cao Cao's death, Cao Pi usurped the throne from Emperor Xian, ended the Eastern Han dynasty and established the state of Cao Wei with himself as the emperor. Cao Pi then appointed Wu Zhi as North General of the Household (北中郎將) and granted him imperial authority to supervise military affairs in You and Bing provinces. Later, Wu Zhi was promoted to General Who Inspires Might (振威將軍) and put in charge of overseeing military affairs in the Hebei region.

In 230, during the reign of Cao Pi's successor Cao Rui, Wu Zhi was reassigned to be a Palace Attendant (侍中). He died in the summer of that year. After his death, some officials suggested to Cao Rui to give him a negative-sounding posthumous title, "Marquis Chou" (醜侯; "ugly marquis"), because Wu Zhi used his close friendship with Cao Pi to gain power and status. Although Cao Rui initially agreed, he later changed Wu Zhi's posthumous title to "Marquis Wei" (威侯) after Wu Zhi's son, Wu Ying (吳應), convinced him that the posthumous title did not befit his father.

== Anecdotes ==
Around 217, before Cao Cao left for the Hanzhong Campaign, Cao Zhi sang praises of his father while seeing him off and earned much favour from his father. Cao Pi, feeling uneasy that Cao Zhi had stolen the limelight, turned to Wu Zhi for advice. Wu Zhi instructed Cao Pi to cry while seeing his father off. Cao Pi did so and touched the hearts of many people, who felt that Cao Pi was much more sincere in expressing his emotions as compared to Cao Zhi. In another incident, Wu Zhi did not want to be seen as being too close to Cao Pi, so he sneaked into Cao Pi's residence by hiding in a silk hamper. When Yang Xiu, Cao Zhi's close friend and adviser, heard about it, he reported it to Cao Cao. Wu Zhi, knowing that Yang Xiu knew his trick, stopped sneaking into Cao Pi's residence and he instructed Cao Pi to refill the hamper with silk. When Cao Cao and Yang Xiu came to investigate, they did not find Wu Zhi hiding inside the hamper, so Cao Cao became very displeased with Yang Xiu.

In 224, Cao Pi ordered Wu Zhi to host a banquet in his residence to celebrate Cao Zhen's return from a campaign. During the banquet, Wu Zhi instructed actors to put up a skit to make fun of Cao Zhen and Zhu Shuo (朱鑠), who were fat and thin respectively. Cao Zhen turned furious and he shouted at Wu Zhi, "Are you and your men seeking a fight with me and my men?" Cao Hong and Wang Zhong egged Wu Zhi on by saying, "If you want to make the General (Cao Zhen) admit that he is fat, you have to show that you're thin." Cao Zhen drew his sword, glared at them and said, "I'll kill whoever dares to mock me." Wu Zhi also drew his sword and insulted Cao Zhen by saying, "Cao Zidan, you're not meat under a butcher's cleaver. My throat won't tremble when I swallow you and my teeth won't chatter when I chew on you. How dare you behave so rudely!" Zhu Shuo stood up and tried to reduce tensions by telling Wu Zhi, "His Majesty ordered you to host entertainment for everyone. Do you have to do this?" Wu Zhi then shouted at Zhu Shuo, "Zhu Shuo, how dare you leave your seat!" Everyone then returned to their seats. Zhu Shuo felt outraged but did not say anything, and returned to his seat and used his sword to hit the ground.

== See also ==
- Lists of people of the Three Kingdoms
