= Sima Shi =

Cao Wei state general and regent (208-255)

- 司馬師
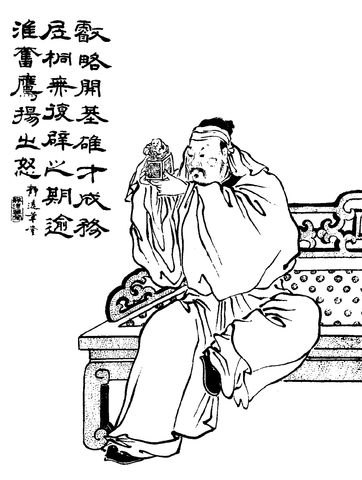
- A Qing dynasty illustration of Sima Shi

Regent of Cao Wei
- In office 7 September 251 – 23 March 255
- Monarchs: Cao Fang; Cao Mao
- Preceded by: Sima Yi
- Succeeded by: Sima Zhao

Personal details
- Born: 208
- Died: 23 March 255 (aged 47) Xuchang, Henan
- Spouse: Empress Jinghuai Lady Wu Empress Jingxian
- Issue Detail: five daughters
Names
- Family name: Sima (司馬); Given name: Shi (師); Courtesy name: Ziyuan (子元)
Posthumous name
- Emperor Jing (景皇帝)
Temple name
- Shizong (世宗)
- House: House of Sima
- Father: Sima Yi
- Mother: Empress Xuanmu

Sima Shi (208 – 23 March 255), courtesy name Ziyuan, was a military general and regent of Cao Wei during the Three Kingdoms period of China. In February 249, he assisted his father Sima Yi in overthrowing the emperor Cao Fang's regent Cao Shuang, allowing the Sima family to become paramount authority in the state, and he inherited his father's authority after his father's death in September 251. He maintained a tight grip on the political scene and, when the emperor, Cao Fang, considered action against him in 254, had him deposed and replaced with his cousin, Cao Mao. This tight grip eventually allowed him to, at the time of his death in March 255 after just having quelled a rebellion, transfer his power to his younger brother, Sima Zhao, whose son Sima Yan eventually usurped the throne and established the Jin dynasty.

After Sima Yan became emperor, he, recognising Sima Shi's role in his own imperial status, posthumously honoured his uncle as Emperor Jing (景皇帝), with the temple name Shizong (世宗).

== Early life ==
Sima Shi was born in 208. He was Sima Yi's oldest son, born of Sima Yi's wife, Zhang Chunhua (張春華). When he was young, he was known for the elegance in his conduct and his intelligence, earning him a reputation equal to that of Xiahou Xuan and He Yan, with He Yan having gone as far as to once state: "The only person who could have the great achievements under the heaven is probably Sima Ziyuan." Sima Shi did not occupy any official position until he was 30 years old. It is likely that he was among the young intellectuals who were banned by Cao Rui from holding official positions due to the "fuhua an" (浮华案) incident. (Note: This incident refers to an edict issued on 5 March 230, decreeing that officials deemed to have "mere appearances and no actual talent" were to be dismissed. Known officials affected by this decree include He Yan, Zhuge Dan, Li Sheng, Deng Yang, and Xiahou Xuan; note that most of the officials mentioned here later died in the aftermath of the Incident at the Gaoping Tombs, Xiahou Xuan was accused of a plot against Sima Shi and executed, while Zhuge Dan died while rebelling against Sima Zhao.) Between 237 and 239, Sima Shi was appointed as Cavalier Attendant-in-Ordinary (散騎常侍). Unfortunately, his career still did not progress smoothly as his family was Cao Shuang's opposition. He finally received some promotions to the post of Military Protector of the Palace (中護軍) through some political concession. (Note: As the Military Protector of the Palace can order troops within palace grounds, this was probably the first sign that Sima Yi had ulterior intentions. During the Incident at the Gaoping Tombs, Sima Shi was in this post. Also, as Military Protector of the Palace, Sima Shi was noted for his objectiveness and impartiality. The troops who were dismissed due to his "impartiality" could have been a source from which the 3000 troops he commanded during the Incident at the Gaoping Tombs came from.)

Sima Shi's first wife, Xiahou Hui died in 234; they had five daughters together. How she died was disputed. Her biography in Book of Jin indicated that she eventually realised that her husband was not loyal to Wei; Sima Shi too became wary of her, due to her familial ties with the royal Cao clan of Wei. In 234, Xiahou Hui died after being poisoned. In his Zizhi Tongjian Kaoyi (资治通鉴考异), Sima Guang expressed his skepticism of this account. He argued that at this point, Sima Yi had just earned Cao Rui's trust, and showed no signs of disloyalty; his sons had no reasons to be disloyal as well. Thus, he didn't include this account in Zizhi Tongjian.

== Career up to 251 ==
=== Incident at the Gaoping Tombs ===
When Sima Yi started planning a coup d'état against Cao Shuang; according to the Jin Shu, Sima Yi confided only in Sima Shi, excluding even Shi's younger brother Sima Zhao from the discussion. (Note: Sima Guang found this unlikely; in his Zizhi Tongjian, he opined that Sima Yi planned the coup with both Sima Shi and Sima Zhao.) Sima Shi put together a group of 3,000 loyal men without knowledge by Cao Shuang or his associates, and when Sima Yi set to carry out his plans in February 249, Sima Shi was able to quickly summon the men to carry out the coup.

Once Sima Yi overthrew Cao Shuang and became the sole regent for the emperor, Cao Fang, he rewarded his son with the title Marquess of Changpingxiang, a large fief of 1,000 households, and shortly thereafter, the rank of General of the Guards (衛將軍). Sima Shi became his father's assistant, although there was no particular record of his accomplishments during these years. After Sima Yi died in September 251, he took over his father's positions without significant opposition—after his father had, earlier that year, suppressed a failed rebellion by Wang Ling (王淩) and massacred the clans of Wang and his associates.

== As paramount authority ==
=== During Cao Fang's reign ===
==== Early regency ====
Sima Shi would go on to rule the government effectively and impartially, ordering that all officials recommend talents to him, that they define the hierarchical ranks, take care of the impoverished and the orphaned, and deal with the delayed personnel affairs.

Shortly after his father's death, the emperor appointed him to the position of General-in-Chief Who Pacifies the Army (撫軍大將軍). In late 251, Deng Ai, the Grand Administrator of Chengyang, submitted a memorial to the court in which he stated that the Five Divisions of Xiongnu (匈奴五部) under Liu Bao were growing too powerful, and therefore proposed a method of giving the Xiongnu under Liu Bao titles and awards, so as to divide and weaken them, and to further settle them somewhere further away from the Chinese citizens and to reeducate them on Chinese cultural traditions, a proposal to which Sima Shi agreed to.

At around the start of 252, Sima Shi was further promoted to the position of General-in-Chief (大將軍), while also being bestowed upon a post as Palace Attendant (侍中), effectively giving him all control of the armies stationed both in and outside the palace. He was also given authority over the Imperial Secretariat (錄尚書事).

It was once proposed to him to alter the existing constitutions, to which he responded: "A poet used to praise those who ‘abide by the principles of the Heavenly Lord and appear as if they know nothing themselves’. The institutions and rules devised by ancestors of the Three Dynasties should be complied with. If there is no war, there should be no reforms in haste."

==== Battle of Hefei ====
Sima Shi was a capable politician and administrator, but he also quickly wanted to prove his military reputation. Towards the end of 252, he launched a major attack against Eastern Wu, whose founding emperor, Sun Quan, had recently died and whose current emperor, Sun Liang, was under the regency of Zhuge Ke. Zhuge Ke was able to deal Sima Shi's forces, headed by Sima Zhao, a major blow at the Battle of Dongxing, but Sima Shi maintained himself well by making humble admissions of faults to the public and promoting the generals who tried to stop his campaign. In 253, after Sima Shi defeated Zhuge Ke in a major battle, his reputation was established, while Zhuge Ke's own was undermined (due to Zhuge Ke's failure to admit fault), and Zhuge Ke soon fell while Sima Shi's power was affirmed.

==== Deposing Cao Fang ====
In 254, Sima Shi made a violent move to consolidate his power, at Cao Fang's expense. Cao Fang had aligned himself with the minister Li Feng (李豐), and Sima Shi had growing suspicions that they were plotting against him. He summoned and interrogated Li Feng, and when Li refused to disclose his conversations with the emperor, Sima Shi beat him to death with a sword handle and then accused Li Feng and his friends Xiahou Xuan (夏侯玄) and Zhang Ji (張緝) of treason, and had them and their families summarily executed. Cao Fang was further forced to depose his wife Empress Zhang, who was Zhang Ji's daughter. These moves further terrorised the officials into submission. Cao Fang was very angry about the deaths of Li Feng and Zhang Ji, and later in 254, his associates submitted a plan to him—that when Sima Shi's brother Sima Zhao would arrive at the palace for an official visit before heading to his defense post at Chang'an, to kill Sima Zhao and seize his troops, and to then use those troops to attack Sima Shi. Cao Fang was apprehensive and paralysed, and did not implement the plan, but news was still leaked to Sima Shi. Sima Shi then forced Cao Fang to step down, although Sima Shi spared his life and gave him his old title of Prince of Qi. When Sima Shi notified Cao Fang's stepmother, Empress Dowager Guo, that he intended to make Cao Pi's brother Cao Ju, the Prince of Pengcheng, emperor, she managed to persuade him that such a succession would be improper—that since Cao Ju was the uncle of her husband, Cao Rui, such a succession would leave Cao Rui effectively sonless with no heir. Sima Shi was forced to agree with her, and he made, as she suggested, Cao Mao emperor instead. Cao Mao, although 14 years old at the time, was known for his intelligence, and Empress Dowager Guo might have believed that he, alone of the princes and dukes, might have had a chance of counteracting the Simas.

=== During Cao Mao's reign ===
==== Second Rebellion at Shouchun and death ====
Despite Empress Dowager Guo's intentions and Cao Mao's own intelligence, they made very little impact in trying to stem the tide of the Simas' growing power. In reaction to the removal of Cao Fang, the general Guanqiu Jian, in 255, as the commander in the important eastern city of Shouchun (壽春; in present-day Lu'an, Anhui), along with another general Wen Qin (文欽), raised a rebellion against the Simas, but were quickly crushed by Sima Shi's army. Guanqiu Jian was killed, and his clan was slaughtered. Wen Qin and his sons fled to Eastern Wu.

The campaign had its tolls on Sima Shi, however. He was ill with an eye disorder at the time that Guanqiu Jian and Wen Qin's rebellion started, and had just had an eye surgery. He was initially therefore reluctant to lead the forces himself and wanted his uncle, Sima Fu, to lead the forces against Guanqiu Jian and Wen Qin. At the urging of Wang Su, Fu Gu (傅嘏), and Zhong Hui, he led the troops himself, which was important in the victory against Guanqiu Jian, but during one of the raids made by Wen Qin's son Wen Yang (文鴦), Sima Shi, in his anxiety, aggravated the eye that he had just had the operation in—causing his eye to pop out—and his conditions soon deteriorated greatly. Less than a month after he put down the rebellion, he died while at Xuchang (許昌; in present-day Xuchang, Henan), with his brother Sima Zhao in attendance to succeed him.

During his lifetime, Sima Shi was unable to conceive a male heir, so he adopted Sima Zhao's second son, Sima You as his own. However, at the time of his death, You was too young to take up his adoptive father's mantle, so the succession fell to Sima Zhao instead. In 264, Zhao considered making You his heir to pass the succession back to Shi's line, but in the end, opted for his own eldest son, Sima Yan, who founded the Western Jin dynasty in 266.

== Family ==
- Empress Jinghuai, of the Xiahou clan (景懷皇后 夏侯氏, 211 – 234), personal name Hui (徽), daughter of Xiahou Shang
  - Lady Sima, of the Sima Clan (司馬氏), first daughter
  - Lady Sima, of the Sima Clan (司馬氏), second daughter
  - Lady Sima, of the Sima Clan (司馬氏), third daughter
  - Lady Sima, of the Sima Clan (司馬氏), fourth daughter
  - Lady Sima, of the Sima Clan (司馬氏), sixth daughter

One of Sima Shi's daughters married Zhen De, (Note: Zhen De was originally a male relative of Cao Rui's wife Empress Mingyuan. When Cao Rui's daughter Cao Shu died in 232, Guo De was declared to be Cao Shu's son. As Cao Shu was buried together with Zhen Huang, a deceased grandson of Lady Zhen's brother, Guo's surname was changed to "Zhen". After Zhen De's wife died young, he married a daughter of Sima Zhao and Wang Yuanji, the Princess Jingzhao.) but which daughter is unknown.

- Empress Jingxian, of the Yang clan (景獻皇后 羊氏, 214 – 278), personal name Huyu (徽瑜)
- Furen, of the Wu clan (吴夫人), Wu Zhi's daughter

Adopted son: Sima You, Sima Zhao's second son

== In popular culture ==
Sima Shi first appears as a playable character in the seventh instalment of Koei's Dynasty Warriors video games series.

== See also ==
- Lists of people of the Three Kingdoms
