= Emperor Wu of Jin =

Emperor of the Jin dynasty from 266 to 290

Emperor Wu of Jin 晉武帝
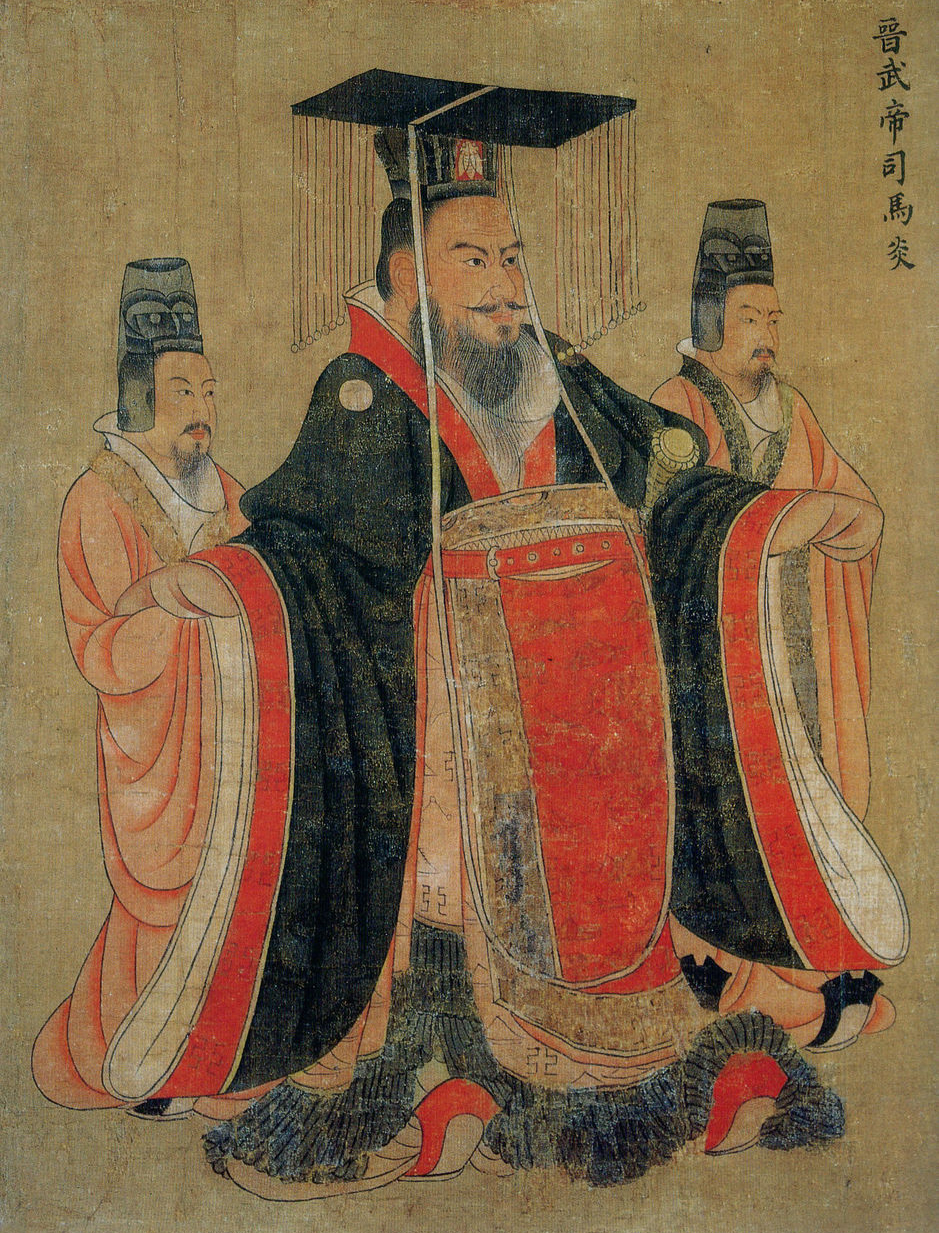
- Tang dynasty portrait of Emperor Wu, by Yan Liben

Emperor of the Jin dynasty
- Reign: 8 February 266 – 16 May 290
- Successor: Emperor Hui

King of Jin (晉王)
- Tenure: 7 September 265 – 8 February 266
- Predecessor: Sima Zhao

Regent of Cao Wei
- Tenure: 7 September 265 – 8 February 266
- Predecessor: Sima Zhao
- Born: 236
- Died: 16 May 290 (aged 53–54)
- Spouse: Empress Wuyuan; Empress Wudao; Empress Dowager Wuhuai
- Issue: Emperor Hui of Jin; Sima Wei, Prince Yin of Chu; Sima Yun, Prince Zhongzhuang of Huainan; Sima Ai, Prince Li of Changsha; Sima Ying, Prince of Chengdu; Emperor Huai of Jin; at least 24 more
Names
- Family name: Sīmǎ (司馬); Given name: Yán (炎); Courtesy name: Ānshì (安世)
Posthumous name
- Wǔ (武; lit. ''martial'')
Temple name
- Shìzǔ (世祖)
- House: Sima
- Dynasty: Jin (Western Jin)
- Father: Sima Zhao
- Mother: Empress Wenming

Emperor Wu of Jin (simplified Chinese: 晋武帝; traditional Chinese: 晉武帝; pinyin: Jìn Wǔ Dì; Wade–Giles: Chin Wu-Ti; 236 – 16 May 290), personal name Sima Yan, courtesy name Anshi, was the first emperor of the Jin dynasty after forcing Cao Huan, the last emperor of the state of Cao Wei, to abdicate in his favor. He reigned from 266 to 290, and after conquering the state of Eastern Wu in 280, was the emperor of a reunified China. He was a grandson of Sima Yi, nephew of Sima Shi and son of Sima Zhao. Emperor Wu was also known for his lust, especially after the unification of China; legends boasted of his incredible potency among ten thousand concubines.

Emperor Wu was commonly viewed as benevolent, but also wasteful. His generosity and kindness undermined his rule, as he became overly tolerant of the aristocratic clans' (世族 or 士族; a political/bureaucratic landlord class from Eastern Han to the Tang dynasty) corruption and extravagance, which drained the people's resources. Further, when Emperor Wu established the Jin dynasty, he was concerned about his regime's stability, and, believing that the predecessor state, Cao Wei, had been doomed by its policy of constraining the princes of the imperial clan, he delegated great authority to his uncles, cousins and sons, including independent military power. This ironically caused to the destabilization of the Western Jin, as the princes engaged in an internecine struggle known as the War of the Eight Princes soon after his death. This conflict led to the uprisings of the Five Barbarians that destroyed the Western Jin and forced its successor, Eastern Jin, to relocate to the region south of the Huai River.

== Life under Cao Wei ==
Sima Yan was born to Sima Zhao and his wife Wang Yuanji, daughter of the Confucian scholar Wang Su, in 236, as their oldest son. At that time, Sima Zhao was a mid-level official in the government of Cao Wei and a member of a privileged clan, as the son of the general Sima Yi. After Sima Yi seized power from the regent Cao Shuang in February 249 in the Incident at the Gaoping Tombs, Sima Zhao became more influential in the state. After his father's death in September 251, Sima Zhao became the assistant to his brother, the new regent Sima Shi. After Sima Shi died in March 255, Sima Zhao became regent and the paramount authority in the Wei government.

Sima Yan's first important appearance in history was in 260, when forces loyal to his father, led by Jia Chong, defeated an attempt by the Wei emperor Cao Mao to take back power and killed Cao Mao. At that time, as a mid-level army general, he was commissioned by his father to escort the new emperor Cao Huan (then still known as Cao Huang) from his dukedom to the capital Luoyang; Sima Yan went to Ye to receive Cao. After his father was created the Duke of Jin on 9 December 263 in light of the army's conquest of Shu Han, he was named heir. However, at times Sima Zhao hesitated as to whether Sima Yan or his brother Sima You would be the more appropriate heir—as Sima You was considered talented and had also been adopted by Sima Shi, who had no biological sons of his own, and Sima Zhao, remembering his brother's role in the Simas' takeover of power, thought it might be appropriate to return power to his branch of the clan. However, a number of high level officials favored Sima Yan, and Sima Zhao agreed. After Sima Zhao was created the King of Jin on 2 May 264 (thus reaching the penultimate step towards usurpation), Sima Yan was created the Crown Prince of Jin in June 265.

On 6 September 265, Sima Zhao died without having formally taken imperial authority. Sima Yan became the King of Jin by the next day. On 4 February 266, he forced Cao Huan to abdicate, ending the state of Cao Wei. Four days later, on 8 February 266, he declared himself emperor of the Jin dynasty.

== As Emperor of Jin ==
=== Early reign: establishment of the Jin political system ===
Emperor Wu immediately sought to avoid what he saw as Cao Wei's fatal weakness—lack of power among the imperial princes. In February 266, immediately after taking the throne, he made princes of many of his uncles, cousins, brothers, and sons, each with independent military commands and full authority within their principalities. This system, while it would be scaled back after the War of the Eight Princes and the loss of northern China, would remain in place as a Jin institution for the duration of the dynasty's existence, and would be adopted by the succeeding Southern dynasties as well.

Another problem that Emperor Wu saw with Cao Wei's political system was its harshness in penal law, and he sought to reform the penal system to make it more merciful—but the key beneficiaries of his changes turned out to be the nobles, as it quickly became clear that the mercy was being dealt out in an unequal manner. Nobles who committed crimes often received simple rebukes, while there were no meaningful reductions in penalties for commoners. This led to massive corruption and extravagant living by the nobles, while the poor went without government assistance. For example, in 267, when several high level officials were found to have worked in conjunction with a county magistrate to seize public land for themselves, Emperor Wu refused to punish the high level officials while punishing the county magistrate harshly.

Emperor Wu faced two major military issues almost immediately—incessant harassment from the rival Eastern Wu's forces, under emperor Sun Hao, and tribal rebellions in Qin (秦) and Liang (涼) provinces (modern Gansu). Most officials were more concerned about the Xianbei, Qiang and other tribes in northwestern China and also with the Xiongnu in modern Shanxi, who were resettled there after the dissolution of their state by Cao Cao in 216 under the watchful eyes of Chinese officials, and were feared for their military abilities. These officials advised Emperor Wu to try to suppress the tribes before considering conquests of Eastern Wu. Under the encouragement of the generals Yang Hu and Wang Jun and the strategist Zhang Hua, however, Emperor Wu, while sending a number of generals to combat the tribes, prepared the southern and eastern border regions for war against Eastern Wu throughout this part of his reign. He was particularly encouraged by reports of Sun Hao's cruelty and ineptitude in governing Eastern Wu; indeed, the officials in favor of war against Eastern Wu often cited this as reason to act quickly, as they argued that Eastern Wu would be harder to conquer if and when Sun Hao was replaced. However, after a major revolt by the Xianbei chief Tufa Shujineng started in 270 in Qin Province, Emperor Wu's attention became concentrated on Tufa, as Tufa was able to win victory after victory over Jin generals. In 271, the Xiongnu noble Liu Meng rebelled in Bing province as well, and while his rebellion did not last long, this took Emperor Wu's attention away from Eastern Wu. In 271, Jiao Province (交州, modern northern Vietnam), which had paid allegiance to Jin ever since the start of his reign, was recaptured by Eastern Wu. In 272, the Eastern Wu general Bu Chan, in fear that Sun Hao was going to punish him on the basis of false reports against him, tried to surrender the important city of Xiling (西陵, in modern Yichang, Hubei) to Jin, but Jin relief forces were stopped by the Eastern Wu general Lu Kang, who then recaptured Xiling and killed Bu. In light of these failures, Yang took another tack—he started a détente with Lu and treated the Eastern Wu border residents well, causing them to view Jin favorably.

When Emperor Wu ascended the throne in February 266, he honored his mother Wang Yuanji as empress dowager. In 266, he also honored his aunt Yang Huiyu (Sima Shi's wife) an empress dowager, in recognition of his uncle's contributions to the establishment of the Jìn Dynasty. He made his wife Yang Yan empress the same year. In 267, he made her oldest living son, Sima Zhong crown prince—based on the Confucian principle that the oldest son by an emperor's wife should inherit the throne—a selection that would, however, eventually contribute greatly to political instability and the Jin Dynasty's decline, as Crown Prince Zhong appeared to be developmentally disabled and unable to learn the important skills necessary to govern. Emperor Wu further made perhaps a particularly fateful choice on Crown Prince Zhong's behalf—in 272, he selected Jia Nanfeng, the strong-willed daughter of the noble Jia Chong, to be Crown Prince Zhong's princess. Crown Princess Jia would, from that point on, have the crown prince under her own tight control. Before Empress Yang died in 274, she was concerned that whoever the new empress would be, she would have ambitions to replace the crown prince, and therefore Empress Yang asked Emperor Wu to marry her cousin Yang Zhi. He agreed.

In 273, Emperor Wu would undertake a selection of beautiful women from throughout the empire—a warning sign of what would eventually come. He looked most attentively at the daughters of high officials, but he also ordered that no marriages take place across the empire until the selection process was done.

=== Middle reign: unification of the Chinese empire ===
In 276, Emperor Wu suffered a major illness—which led to a succession crisis. Crown Prince Zhong would be the legitimate heir, but both the officials and the people hoped that Emperor Wu's capable brother, Sima You, the Prince of Qi, would inherit the throne instead. After Emperor Wu became well, he divested some military commands from officials that he thought favored Prince You, but otherwise took no other punitive actions against anyone.

Later that year, Yang Hu reminded Emperor Wu of his plan to conquer Eastern Wu. Most of the officials, still concerned with Tufa's rebellion, were opposed, but Yang was supported by Du Yu and Zhang. Emperor Wu considered their counsel seriously but did not implement it at this time.

Also in 276, pursuant to his promise to the deceased Empress Yang, Emperor Wu married his cousin Yang Zhi and made her empress. The new Empress Yang's father, Yang Jun, became a key official in the administration and became exceedingly arrogant.

In 279, with the general Ma Long having finally put down Tufa's rebellion, Emperor Wu concentrated his efforts on Eastern Wu, and commissioned a six-pronged attack led by his uncle Sima Zhou, Wang Hun, Wang Rong, Hu Fen (胡奮), Du Yu, and Wang Jun, with the largest forces under Wang Hun and Wang Jun. Each of the Jin forces advanced quickly and captured the border cities that they were targeting, with Wang Jun's fleet heading east down the Yangtze and clearing the river of Eastern Wu fleets. The Eastern Wu chancellor Zhang Ti (張悌) made a last-ditch attempt to defeat Wang Hun's force, but was defeated and killed. Wang Hun, Wang Jun, and Sima Zhou each headed for Jianye, and Sun Hao was forced to surrender on 1 May 280. (Note: Sun Hao's biography in the Sanguozhi recorded that Sun Hao surrendered on the renshen day of the 3rd month of the 4th year of the Tianji era of his reign. This is an error as there was no renshen day in that month. The Zizhi Tongjian recorded that it was the renyin day of the 3rd month of the 1st year of the Taikang era of Sima Yan's reign. This date corresponds to 1 May 280 in the Julian calendar. Emperor Wu's biography in Book of Jin gave the same date as the one recorded in Sun Hao's biography in Sanguozhi. However, Wang Jun's biography recorded a memorial to the throne in which he wrote that he reached Moling on the 15th day of that month. The 15th day of the 3rd month of that year was a renyin day.) Emperor Wu made Sun Hao the Marquess of Guiming. The integration of former Eastern Wu territory into Jin appeared to have been a relatively smooth process.

After the fall of Eastern Wu, Emperor Wu ordered that provincial governors no longer be in charge of military matters and become purely civilian governors, and that regional militias be disbanded, despite opposition by the general Tao Huang and the key official Shan Tao. This would also eventually prove to create problems later on during the upheaval of the Five Barbarians, as the regional governors were not able to raise troops to resist quickly enough. He also rejected advice to have the non-Han gradually moved outside of the empire proper.

=== Late reign: setting the stage for disasters ===
In 281, Emperor Wu took 5,000 women from Sun Hao's palace into his own, and thereafter became even more concentrated on feasting and enjoying the women, rather than on important matters of state. It was said that there were so many beautiful women in the palace that he did not know whom he should have sexual relations with; he therefore rode on a small cart drawn by goats, and wherever the goats would stop, he would stop there, as well. Because of this, many of the women planted bamboo leaves and salt outside their bedrooms—both items said to be favored by goats. Empress Yang's father Yang Jun and uncles Yang Yao (楊珧) and Yang Ji (楊濟) became effectively in power.

Emperor Wu also became more concerned about whether his brother Prince You would seize the throne if he died. In January 283, he sent Prince You to his principality, even though there was no evidence that Prince You had such ambitions. Princess Jingzhao and Princess Changshan kow-towed and begged Emperor Wu to rescind his order, but he merely grew angry and demoted Princess Changshan's husband in retaliation. Many officials, including Emperor Wu's friend Cao Zhi, opposed the idea; Emperor Wu ordered these officials to be put on trial; Cao Zhi was relieved of his posts and sent back to his residence. Prince You, in anger, grew ill and died in April.

Following previous Roman embassies in 166 and 226, the Book of Jin and Wenxian Tongkao record another embassy from "Da Qin" appearing in China during the reign of Emperor Wu. These histories assert that it arrived in 284 and presented tributary gifts to the emperor.

As Emperor Wu grew ill in 289, he considered whom to make regent. He considered both Yang Jun and his uncle Sima Liang the Prince of Ru'nan, the most respected of the imperial princes. As a result, Yang Jun became fearful of Sima Liang and had him posted to the key city of Xuchang. Several other imperial princes were also posted to other key cities in the empire. By 290, Emperor Wu resolved to let Yang and Sima Liang both be regents, but after he wrote his will, the will was seized by Yang Jun, who instead had another will promulgated in which Yang alone was named regent. Emperor Wu died soon thereafter, leaving the empire in the hands of a developmentally disabled son and nobles intent on shedding each other's blood for power, and while he would not see the disastrous consequences himself, the consequences would soon come.

== Era names ==
- Taishi (Chinese: 泰始; pinyin: tài shǐ) 265–274
- Xianning (Chinese: 咸寧; pinyin: xián níng) 275–280
- Taikang (Chinese: 太康; pinyin: tài kāng) 280–289
- Taixi (Chinese: 太熙; pinyin: tài xī) 28 January 290 – 16 May 290

== Family ==
- Empress Wuyuan, of the Yang clan of Hongnong (武元皇后 弘農楊氏; 238–274), personal name Yan (艷)
  - Sima Gui, Prince Dao of Piling (毗陵悼王 司馬軌), first son
  - Sima Zhong, Emperor Xiaohui (孝惠皇帝 司馬衷; 259–307), second son
  - Sima Jian, Prince Xian of Qin (秦獻王 司馬柬; 262–291), third son
  - Princess Pingyang (平陽公主)
  - Princess Xinfeng (新豐公主)
  - Princess Yangping (陽平公主)
- Empress Wudao, of the Yang clan of Hongnong (武悼皇后 弘農楊氏; 259–292), personal name Zhi (芷)
  - Sima Hui, Prince Shang of Bohai (渤海殤王 司馬恢; 283–284), 24th son
- Empress Dowager Wuhuai, of the Wang clan (武懷皇太后 王氏), personal name Yuanji (媛姬)
  - Sima Chi, Emperor Xiaohuai (孝懷皇帝 司馬熾; 284–313), 25th son
- Guipin, of the Zuo clan (貴嬪 左氏; 253–300), personal name Fen (棻)
- Guipin, of the Hu clan of Anding (貴嬪 安定胡氏), personal name Fang (芳)
  - Princess Wu'an (武安公主)
    - Married Wen Yu (溫裕)
- Furen, of the Li clan (夫人 李氏)
  - Sima Yun, Prince Zhongzhuang of Huainan (淮南忠壯王 司馬允; 272–300), tenth son
  - Sima Yan, Prince Xiao of Wu (吳孝王 司馬晏; 281–311), 23rd son
- Meiren, of the Shen clan (美人 審氏)
  - Sima Jingdu, Prince Huai of Chengyang (城陽懷王 司馬景度; d. 270), fourth son
  - Sima Wei, Prince Yin of Chu (楚隱王 司馬瑋; 271–291), ninth son
  - Sima Ai, Prince Li of Changsha (長沙厲王 司馬乂; 277–304), 17th son
- Meiren, of the Zhao clan (美人 趙氏)
  - Sima Yan, Prince Ai of Dai (代哀王 司馬演; b. 272), 11th son
- Meiren, of the Chen clan (美人 陳氏)
  - Sima Xia, Prince Kang of Qinghe (清河康王 司馬遐; 273–300), 13th son
- Cairen, of the Xu clan (才人 徐氏)
  - Sima Xian, Prince Shang of Chengyang (城陽殤王 司馬憲; 270–271), fifth son
- Cairen, of the Gui clan (才人 匱氏)
  - Sima Zhi, Prince Chong of Donghai (東海衝王 司馬祗; 271–273), sixth son
- Cairen, of the Zhao clan (才人 趙氏)
  - Sima Yu, Prince Ai of Shiping (始平哀王 司馬裕; 271–277), seventh son
- Cairen, of the Cheng clan (才人 程氏)
  - Sima Ying, Prince of Chengdu (成都王 司馬穎; 279–306), 19th son
- Baolin, of the Zhuang clan (保林 莊氏)
  - Sima Gai, Prince Huai of Xindu (新都懷王 司馬該; 272–283), 12th son
- Lady, of the Zhu clan (諸氏)
  - Sima Mo, Prince Ai of Ruyin (汝陰哀王 司馬謨; 276–286), 14th son
- Unknown
  - Princess Changshan (常山公主)
    - Married Wang Ji of Taiyuan (太原 王濟)
  - Princess Fanchang (繁昌公主)
    - Married Wei Xuan of Hedong (河東 衛宣), the fourth son of Wei Guan
  - Princess Xiangcheng (襄城公主)
    - Married Wang Dun of Langya, Duke of Wuchang (琊瑯; 266–324)
  - Princess Wannian (萬年公主)
  - Princess Xingyang (滎陽公主)
    - Married Hua Heng (華恆; 267–335)
  - Princess Yingchuan (潁川公主)
    - Married Wang Cui (王粹; d. 308)
  - Princess Guangping (廣平公主)
  - Princess Lingshou (靈壽公主)

== See also ==
- Chinese emperors family tree (early)
- Family tree of Sima Yi
- Lists of people of the Three Kingdoms
- List of Chinese monarchs

== Notes ==
Emperor Wu of Jin House of Sima Born: 236 Died: 16 May 290
Regnal titles
Preceded by Himself as Titular Emperor of China	Emperor of China; Western Jin; 1 May 280 - 16 May 290	Succeeded by Emperor Hui of Jin
Preceded by Sun Hao	Emperor of China; Western Jin; 1 May 280 - 16 May 290	Succeeded by Emperor Hui of Jin
Chinese royalty
Preceded by Cao Huan	— TITULAR — Emperor of China; 8 February 266 - 1 May 280	Succeeded by Himself
Titles in pretence
Preceded by Sima Zhao	King of Jin; 7 September 265 - 8 February 266	Merged in the Crown
