= Sima Zhao =

Regent of Cao Wei from 255 to 265

Sima Zhao 司馬昭
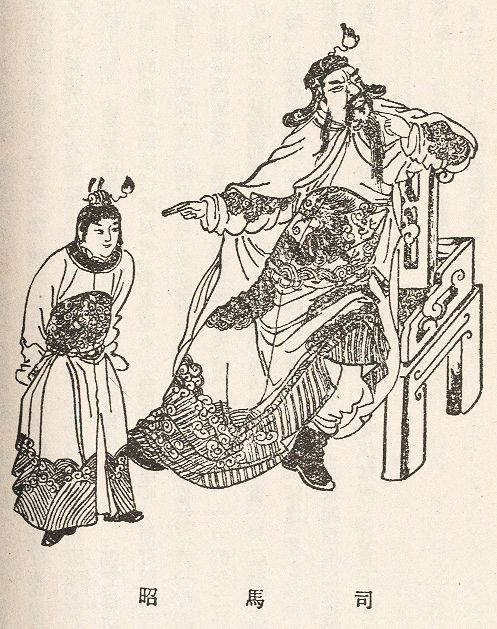
- Qing dynasty illustration of Sima Zhao (right)

King of Jin (晉王)
- Tenure: 2 May 264 – 6 September 265
- Successor: Sima Yan

Duke of Jin (晉公)
- Tenure: 9 December 263 – 2 May 264

Regent of Cao Wei
- Tenure: 23 March 255 – 6 September 265
- Predecessor: Sima Shi
- Successor: Sima Yan
- Born: 211
- Died: September 6, 265 (aged 53–54); Luoyang, Henan
- Consorts: Empress Wenming
- Issue: Emperor Wu; Sima You; Sima Jian; Sima Ji; Sima Yanzuo; Princess Jingzhao
Names
- Family name: Sima (司馬); Given name: Zhao (昭); Courtesy name: Zishang (子上)
Temple name
- Taizu (太祖)
- House: House of Sima
- Father: Sima Yi
- Mother: Empress Xuanmu

Sima Zhao (Chinese: 司馬昭; pinyin: Sīmǎ Zhāo; 211 – 6 September 265), courtesy name Zishang (子上), was a Chinese military general, politician, and regent of the state of Cao Wei during the Three Kingdoms period of China.

Sima Zhao capably maintained control of Wei, which had been seized by his father Sima Yi and previously maintained by his older brother Sima Shi, successfully crushing all internal opposition in the form of dissent and rebellion. In 263, despite opposition, he decided to take advantage of the present weakness in Shu Han to the west and launched an invasion against it, which eventually managed to convince its emperor, Liu Shan, towards formally surrendering, tipping the decades-long established balance of power decisively in Wei's favor. Towards the end of the campaign, he had himself created the Duke of Jin and accepted the Nine bestowments—a step that put him closer to usurpation of the throne—although he never actually ascended the throne, having further styled himself the King of Jin in 264, and then died in 265. His military credit and successful grip on the political scene helped to set up the plot of overthrowing Wei by his son, Sima Yan, who usurped the Wei throne and proclaimed the Jin dynasty with himself as its emperor in 266. After the establishment of Jin, Sima Yan posthumously honoured his father as Emperor Wen of Jin (晉文帝), with the temple name of Taizu (太祖).

A Chinese idiom involving and inspired by Sima Zhao states that "Everyone on the street knows what's in Sima Zhao's mind" (司馬昭之心, 路人皆知), meaning that a person's supposed hidden intention (in this case, usurping the throne) is so well known that it is not really hidden. It came from a quote by Cao Mao, fourth emperor of Wei, who launched an unsuccessful uprising against Sima Zhao in an attempt to take back imperial power.

== Early life ==
Sima Zhao was born in 211, as the second-born son of Sima Yi and his wife Zhang Chunhua, younger only to Sima Shi. (Note: Sima Zhao's biography in Book of Jin recorded that he was a younger full-brother of Sima Shi. Of Sima Yi's sons, only Sima Shi (first), Sima Liang (fourth) and Sima Lun (ninth) had their birth orders explicitly recorded in Book of Jin.) As his father was an important Wei official, Sima Zhao himself climbed up the ranks of officials fairly rapidly. Due to his father's achievements in destroying the warlord Gongsun Yuan, he was created a Marquess of Xincheng (Note: Fang’s note 4.5 of Jiaping 5; Xincheng was the site of Sima Yi’s famous victory over the traitorous Meng Da, so this place likely held special significance to the Sima family.) in 238 towards the end of the year. Around 240, he was made the General of the Gentlemen of the Agriculture Colonies of Luoyang (洛阳典農中郎將). (Note: Sima Zhao took on this post after the lavish spending and construction spree of Cao Rui, who died in January 239. Zhao reduced the populace's taxation and allowed them to go about their agricultural activities without interruption; this earned him adulation. His cousin Sima Wang also held this position, possibly succeeding Zhao when the latter became a Cavalier Attendant-in-Ordinary.) A year later, around 241, he was appointed as Cavalier Attendant-in-Ordinary (散騎常侍). In March 244, he partook in Cao Shuang's disastrous campaign against Shu, where he managed to drive off a night-raid on his camp led by Shu forces. Despite the ultimate failure of the campaign, he was promoted to the rank of Consultant Gentleman. (Note: a position typically regarded as a placeholder, in which he himself was kept for over five years, which was likely bestowed upon him by Cao Shuang and his group so that he would be kept from further political advancement.)

== Career up to 255 ==
=== Incident at Gaoping Tombs ===
Sima Zhao's involvement in his father's coup d'état against the regent Cao Shuang in 249 is unclear. According to the Book of Jin, he was not told about the plan, hatched by his father and his older brother, until the last minute—a view disagreed with by other historians, who assert that he was intimately involved in the planning. Regardless, in the aftermath of the successful coup his father became the paramount political authority in Wei, and he himself received an addition of 1,000 households to his fief and became important in status. In 251, when his father suppressed the failed rebellion of Wang Ling, Sima Zhao served as deputy commander, and was rewarded with the addition of 300 households to his fief and a Marquis post for his young son, Sima You. During the next few years, he was involved in commanding forces in repelling invasions by Shu's commander of the armed forces, Jiang Wei.

=== Battle of Dongxing ===
In 253, Wei forces headed by Sima Zhao marched east to confront Wu, who had been overstepping their boundaries by building upon a lake and arming it with men on land which belonged to Wei. The Wei officers, feeling secure in their position and with their superior numbers, grew arrogant and allowed themselves to become drunk, and so were quickly overwhelmed by the Wu forces led by Ding Feng and Lü Ju, forcing the Wei forces to flee and retreat. After the loss at the Battle of Dongxing, Sima Zhao asked his Marshal Wang Yi in private who was responsible for the failure of the battle, to which Wang Yi responded: "Responsibility lies with the army commander." Sima Zhao retorted: "The Marshal means to make me shoulder the blame?" Thereafter he had Wang Yi executed. Sima Shi, the Wei regent and Sima Zhao's older brother, received memorials from ministers asking that Wang Chang, Guanqiu Jian, Hu Zun, and all the others who were a part of the campaign to be demoted for their failure, however, Sima Shi stated that: "It is because I did not listen to Gongxiu [Zhuge Dan] that we have come to this plight. In this I am culpable; how can the generals be at fault?" He therefore promoted the generals who partook in the battle, while demoting Sima Zhao by removing his enfeoffment.

=== Succeeding Sima Shi ===
In 254, while Sima Zhao was at the capital Luoyang, advisors to the Wei emperor, Cao Fang, suggested that the emperor surprise Sima Zhao and kill him to seize his troops, and then use those troops against Sima Shi. Cao Fang, apprehensive, did not act on the suggestion, but the plot was still discovered, and Sima Zhao assisted his brother in deposing the emperor and replacing him with Cao Mao. In the aftermath of the removal of the emperor, the generals Guanqiu Jian and Wen Qin rebelled in 255 but were defeated by Sima Shi.

Sima Shi, however, had a serious eye illness that was aggravated by the campaign, and he died less than a month later; on 23 March. At that time, Sima Zhao was with his brother at Xuchang. The 14-year-old emperor Cao Mao made an effort to regain imperial power. He issued an edict which, under the rationale that Sima Shi had just quelled Guanqiu Jian and Wen Qin's rebellion and that the southeastern empire was still not completely pacified, ordered Sima Zhao to remain at Xuchang and that Sima Shi's assistant Fu Jia return to Luoyang with the main troops. Under Fu Jia and Zhong Hui's advice, however, Sima Zhao returned to Luoyang anyway against edict, and was able to maintain control of the government. Indeed, from that point on, he did not let Cao Mao or Empress Dowager Guo out of his control.

== As paramount authority ==
=== Consolidation of authority ===
==== Third Rebellion of Shouchun ====
During the next few years, Sima Zhao consolidated his authority further, leaving the emperor and empress dowager with little power. He further built up a series of events that were viewed as precipitations to usurpation of the Wei throne. In 256, he had the emperor grant him the privilege of wearing imperial robes, crowns, and boots. He further tested waters by having his close aides hinting to the generals around the empire as to his intentions. In 257, when he sent Jia Chong to probe Zhuge Dan's intentions, Zhuge rebuked Jia Chong severely —leading Sima Zhao to summon Zhuge Dan back to the capital under the guise of a promotion. Zhuge Dan refused and started a rebellion, submitting himself to Eastern Wu for protection. Sima Zhao advanced quickly on Zhuge Dan's stronghold of Shouchun and surrounded it, eventually capturing the city in 258 after cutting off any hope of an Eastern Wu rescue, killing Zhuge Dan and his family, although he treated many of those involved, such as the common citizens, and most notably the Wu soldiers who had been sent as reinforcements, with great magnanimity, despite being advised to punish the citizens and kill all the soldiers, to which he retorted: "The ancients in using troops, preserving the state is best, so kill the leaders and nothing more. Should the Wú soldiers escape and flee back, then they can report the greatness of the central states." This benevolence managed to cast the Sima family in a more, and much-needed, positive light amongst the populace. After Zhuge Dan's death, there was no one who dared to oppose Sima Zhao further for the next few years. In 258, he would force the emperor to offer him the Nine Bestowments, state chancellorship, and the title of Duke of Jin—a step that put him closer to usurpation—and then publicly declined them nine times.

==== Death of Cao Mao and complete control of the Wei government ====
In c.May 260, Sima Zhao again forced Cao Mao to issue an edict granting him the Nine Bestowments and the promotions, which he then declined again, but which drew Cao Mao's ire. He gathered his associates Wang Shen, Wang Jing, and Wang Ye and told them that, while he knew the chances of success were slight, he was going to act against Sima Zhao. He took lead of the imperial guards, armed himself with a sword, and set out toward Sima Zhao's mansion. Sima Zhao's brother Sima Zhou tried to resist, but after Cao Mao's attendants yelled loudly, Sima Zhou's forces deserted. Jia Chong then arrived and intercepted the imperial guards. Cao Mao fought personally, and Jia Chong's troops, not daring to attack the emperor, were also deserting. One of the officers under Jia Chong's command, Cheng Ji (成濟), after asking Jia what to do and was told by Jia to defend the Sima power regardless of the consequences, took a spear and killed Cao Mao with it. This left Sima Zhao thoroughly vexed.

After Cao Mao's death, public sentiments called for Jia Chong's death, but what Sima Zhao did first was to force Empress Dowager Guo to posthumously demote Cao Mao to common citizen status and order that he be buried as such. He also executed Wang Jing and his family. The next day, after pleas from his uncle Sima Fu, Sima Zhao instead had Empress Dowager Guo order that Cao Mao be promoted back to a duke and buried with the ceremonies of an imperial prince. Sima Zhao then summoned Cao Huan, the Duke of Changdao, and a grandson of Cao Cao, to the capital to become the emperor; by now, Empress Dowager Guo was powerless to speak further. (Note: Cao Huang's name, being a homophone of “Huang” (yellow), which must have been frequently used in daily life, had to be altered to some uncommon character.) In the midst of these events, Sima Zhao went on to decline the Nine Bestowments and the promotions towards state chancellorship and the title of Duke of Jin. Some days later, Sima Zhao publicly accused Cheng Ji and his brothers of treason and had them and their family executed to appease public sentiment while sparing Jia Chong. No one dared to act against Sima Zhao even in the aftermaths of the emperor's death, however, for Sima Zhao was effectively the imperial authority by this point. On 27 June, Cao Huan entered Luoyang and became emperor. Two days later, Sima Zhao forced Cao Huan to confer upon him the Nine Bestowments as well as the promotions towards state chancellorship and the title of Duke of Jin, which he earnestly declined, as well as another time in October.

=== Conquest of Shu ===
In 262, aggravated by Jiang Wei's incessant border attacks, Sima Zhao considered hiring assassins to murder Jiang Wei, but this plan was opposed by his advisor, Xun Xu. Zhong Hui himself believed that Jiang Wei had worn out his troops and that it would be an appropriate time to try to destroy Shu once and for all. Sima Zhao put Zhong Hui, Zhuge Xu, and Deng Ai in charge of the invasion forces (even though the latter initially opposed the campaign), and they set out in autumn 263.

Zhong Hui, Zhuge Xu, and Deng Ai faced little opposition from Shu's forces, whose strategy was to draw the Wei forces in and then close on them—a strategy that backfired, as the Wei forces, much quicker than expected, leapt past Shu border cities and immediately onto the important Yang'an Pass (陽安關; in present-day Hanzhong, Shaanxi), capturing it. Zhuge Xu was eventually expelled and sent back as a prisoner, though, as Deng Ai wanted to merge his own troops with Zhuge Xu's, whereas Zhuge Xu did not deviate from the original plan; he met up with Zhong Hui, who wanted to monopolize on the military situation, and so sent an edict mentioning the cowardice of Zhuge Xu, after which the latter's troops were merged with Zhong Hui's. Jiang Wei was able to regroup and block off the Wei forces from further advances, until Deng Ai led his troops over a treacherous mountain pass, descending on Jiangyou, defeating Zhuge Zhan and heading directly for the Shu capital, Chengdu. Surprised by Deng Ai's quick advances and believing that Jiang Wei would be unable to return fast enough to defend the capital against Deng Ai, the Shu emperor, Liu Shan, surrendered to Wei. Earlier this year, in the spring of 263, Sima Zhao had again declined the Nine Bestowments and the promotions, but during the campaign, in light of the recent successes, on 9 December 263, the emperor, Cao Huan, bestowed upon Sima Zhao the title of the Duke of Jin, the Nine Bestowments, and the position of Chancellor of the State, which Sima Zhao finally accepted.

=== Zhong Hui's Rebellion ===
Another turmoil quickly came after Shu's destruction, however. Deng Ai, proud of his achievements, became arrogant in his correspondence with Sima Zhao, drawing Sima Zhao's suspicion. Zhong Hui, who had plans to rebel himself, quickly forged letters that further damaged the relations between Sima Zhao and Deng Ai beyond repair, and Sima Zhao ordered Zhong Hui to arrest Deng Ai, although he himself, wary of Zhong Hui, nevertheless arrived with his own forces and stationed at Chang'an. Zhong Hui did so, seizing Deng Ai's troops and merging them with his own, and then, with Jiang Wei as his assistant (but with Jiang Wei's actual intentions being to eventually kill Zhong Hui and restore Shu), declared a rebellion in 264, but his troops rebelled against him and killed both him and Jiang Wei, with Sima Zhao going on to bestow an amnesty upon all in Shu.

== Death ==
After Zhong Hui's rebellion was defeated, Sima Zhao was granted the title of King of Jin on 2 May 264, the penultimate step to usurpation. He set out to revise the laws and the civil service system in accordance with how he would want his own empire to be, such as instating the Five Feudal Ranks of Zhou (a system which had fallen out of use since the Qin dynasty abolished it), and also going on to posthumously enfeoff his father, Sima Yi, and older brother, Sima Shi, as King Xuan of Jin and King Jing of Jin respectively. He further sought peace with Eastern Wu, to prevent further complications for his planned takeover, a gesture that was reciprocated.

Later that year, Sima Zhao considered whom to make his heir. He strongly considered his talented younger son, Sima You, who had been adopted by Sima Shi because Sima Shi did not have sons of his own, under the rationale that because Sima Shi had great achievement in the Simas' obtaining and retaining of power, the succession should go back to his son. The majority of his advisors, however, recommended his oldest son, Sima Yan, instead, and Sima Zhao finally resolved to make Sima Yan his designated heir.

On 6 September 265, Sima Zhao died before he could receive actual imperial authority, although he was buried with imperial honors on 20 October 265. (Note: This date (yihai day of the 9th month of the 2nd year of the Xianxi era) is per Cao Huan's biography in Sanguozhi. Sima Zhao's biography in Book of Jin dated the event to the guiyou day of that month (corresponding to 18 Oct 265 in the Julian calendar). In vol.03 of Zizhi Tongjian Kaoyi, Sima Guang indicated that Tongjian adopted the account found in Cao Mao's biography in Sanguozhi when recording the date of Sima Zhao's burial.) Five months later, however, Sima Yan, who had previously inherited his father's authority, would have the Wei emperor, Cao Huan, abdicate in favour of him, ending Wei and establishing the Jin dynasty. After he did so, he posthumously honoured his father, Sima Zhao, as Emperor Wen of Jin (晉文帝).

== Anecdotes ==
At some point between September 258 (Note: Cao Mao's biography in Sanguozhi recorded that Wang Xiang was made sanlao and Zheng Xiaotong was made wugeng on 18 Sep 258.) and June 260, (Note: A Weishi Chunqiu annotation in Zheng Xuan's biography in Book of the Later Han recorded that Zheng Xiaotong was Palace Attendant (侍中) during Cao Mao's reign. The excerpt quoted by Li Xian attributed a quote to Sima Zhao as he killed Zheng Xiaotong; a similar quote was attributed to Cao Cao when he killed Lü Boshe. Sun Sheng was the author of the Weishi Chunqiu and Zaji.) Zheng Xiaotong, grandson of Zheng Xuan, was having a meeting with Sima Zhao. Zhao had with him a secret document which he forgot to secure when he had to go to the toilet. After the toilet trip, Zhao asked Xiaotong if he had read the document. Even after Xiaotong had denied reading it, Zhao still had him poisoned.

== Family ==
Consorts and Issue:

- Empress Wenming, of the Wang clan of Donghai (文明皇后 東海王氏; 217–268), personal name Yuanji (元姬)
  - Princess Jingzhao (京兆公主)
    - Married Zhen De of Xiping (西平 甄德 (Note: Zhen De was originally a male relative of Cao Rui's wife Empress Mingyuan. When Cao Rui's daughter Cao Shu died in 232, Guo De was declared to be Cao Shu's son. As Cao Shu was buried together with a deceased grandson of Lady Zhen's brother Zhen Huang, Guo's surname was changed to "Zhen". Before Princess Jingzhao, Zhen De had married a daughter of Sima Shi, but said daughter died young.)), and had issue (one son)
  - Sima Yan, Emperor Wu (武皇帝 司馬炎; 236–290), first son
  - Sima You, Prince Qixian (齊獻王 司馬攸; 248–283), second son
  - Sima Zhao, Prince Ai of Chengyang (城陽哀王 司馬兆), third son
  - Sima Dingguo, Prince Daohui of Liaodong (遼東悼惠王 司馬定國), fourth son
  - Sima Guangde, Prince Shang of Guanghan (廣漢殤王 司馬廣德), fifth son
- Xiuhua, of the Li clan (修華 李氏), personal name Yan (琰)
- Xiurong, of the Wang clan (修容 王氏), personal name Xuan (宣)
- Xiuyi, of the Xu clan (修儀 徐氏), personal name Yan (琰)
- Jieyu, of the Wu clan (婕妤 吳氏), personal name Shu (淑)
- Chonghua, of the Zhao clan (充華 趙氏), personal name Ting (珽)
- Unknown
  - Sima Jian, Prince Ping of Le'an (樂安平王 司馬鑒; d. 297), sixth son
  - Sima Ji, Prince Yan (燕王 司馬機), seventh son
  - Sima Yongzuo (司馬永祚), eighth son
  - Sima Yanzuo, Prince Leping (樂平王 司馬延祚), ninth son
  - Princess Changshan, married Wang Ji, son of Wang Hun

== In popular culture ==
Sima Zhao is first introduced as a playable character in the seventh instalment of Koei's Dynasty Warriors video game series, in which he is depicted as having a lazy and carefree atmosphere, but underneath it actually being a talented leader and strategist. He is then introduced again as a playable character in Warriors Orochi 3.

== See also ==
- Chinese emperors family tree (early)
- Lists of people of the Three Kingdoms

== Notes ==
Emperor Wen of Jin House of Sima Born: 211 Died: 6 September 265
Chinese royalty
Preceded by Himself as Duke of Jin	King of Jin; 2 May 264 – 6 September 265	Succeeded by Sima Yan later became Emperor Wu of Jin
Chinese nobility
New title	Duke of Jin; 9 December 263 – 2 May 264	Succeeded by Himself as King of Jin
