= Liu Tun =

Jin dynasty minister (died 311)

- 劉暾

Colonel-Director of Retainers (司隸校尉)
- In office 310–311
- Monarch: Emperor Huai of Jin

Personal details
- Born: Unknown Laizhou, Shandong
- Died: 311 Dong'e County, Shandong
- Relations: Prince of Chengyang, Liu Zhang (ancestor)
- Children: Liu You; Liu Bai (died between 307 and April 311) (Note: Liu Tun's biography in Jin Shu recorded that Liu Bai was killed by Sima Yue's men (led by He Lun) during a raid on Liu Tun's residence. This raid likely happened between Yue assuming regency in late 306 and his death in Apr 311.)
- Parent: Liu Yi (father)
- Courtesy name: Changsheng (長升)
- Peerage: Duke of Zhuxu

Liu Tun (died c.October 311), courtesy name Changsheng, was an official of the Jin dynasty (266–420). During the War of the Eight Princes, he was one of the few ministers entrusted with managing the Eastern Court while Emperor Hui of Jin was kept in Chang'an. After the Disaster of Yongjia, Liu Tun was captured and plotted with the Han-Zhao general, Wang Mi, to break away, but was killed by Shi Le not long after. He was also known to have served as Colonel-Director of Retainers five times throughout his career.

== Early life and career ==
Liu Tun was the son of the Cao Wei and Western Jin minister, Liu Yi (died c.March 285). His family was from Ye County, Donglai Commandery, and he was a descendant of the Western Han dynasty prince, Liu Zhang. In 280, he entered the government and was appointed an Academician.

In January 283, Emperor Wu of Jin had his brother the Prince of Qi, Sima You, exiled from Luoyang to his fief. He then had his ministers debate on what should be bestowed on his brother for his achievements, during which Liu Tun, along with his fellow academicians, submitted a petition opposing Sima You's banishment. Emperor Wu was furious and had Liu Tun arrested and sent before the Minister of Justice. He was released following a general amnesty but was relieved of his official duties. He was later appointed Magistrate of Suanzao and then Imperial Clerk.

== War of the Eight Princes ==
=== Service under Empress Jia ===
Emperor Hui of Jin succeeded Emperor Wu, but because of his developmental disability, he was unable to assert real power over the court. Instead, in 291, after the deaths of Yang Jun, Sima Liang and Wei Guan, the imperial court fell under the control of Empress Jia Nanfeng and her relatives, Jia Mi and Guo Zhang, becoming known as the Jia-Guo regime. In c.November 295, a fire broke out in the imperial armory. At the time, Guo Zhang had a hundred men under him who could put out the fire, but he was more interested in protecting his own property. Liu Tun severely questioned him for his actions, and Guo Zhang angrily said, "Sir, I can easily cut off your frontal bone if I wanted to!" Liu Tun replied, "How dare you use favour to act like a tyrant! Are you going to cut the Son of Heaven's faguan as well?" He attempted to remove Guo Zhang from office, and Guo Zhang was unable to defend himself. Despite everyone else making excuses for Guo Zhang, Liu Tun refused to relent. After the incident, Guo Zhang reportedly became less extravagant and led a simpler life.

=== Service under Sima Jiong and Sima Ai ===
Liu Tun was eventually transferred to the Interior Minister of Taiyuan. In February 301, after purging the Jia clan the previous year, the Prince of Zhao, Sima Lun, usurped the throne from Emperor Hui. He appointed Liu Tun as General Who Attacks Barbarians, but he declined. When the Prince of Qi, Sima Jiong, raised a coalition to restore Emperor Hui later that April, Liu Tun raised an army in support of him and joined the Prince of Changshan, Sima Ai.

After Sima Lun was deposed later that year, Liu Tun was appointed Assistant of the Left to the Masters of Writing. During his tenure, he was described as having performed diligently and kept the court free of corruption. He later became an acting Palace Assistant Imperial Clerk, during which he submitted a petition to the court asking it to dismiss more than ten officials, including the Prince of Dong'an, Sima Yao, which earned him praise. He was then officially instated as Palace Assistant Imperial Clerk and appointed Zhongshuzi, Left General of the Guards and Colonel-Director of Retainers. Afterwards, he sent another petition to dismiss a few more officials.

In January 303, when Sima Ai fought Sima Jiong in Luoyang, Liu Tun sided with the former. After Sima Jiong was killed, Sima Ai enfeoffed Liu Tun as the Duke of Zhuxu. The following year, in 304, Sima Ai was defeated by the alliance of the Prince of Hejian, Sima Yong, and the Prince of Chengdu, Sima Ying. Liu Tun was dismissed from his office, but soon returned as Colonel-Director of Retainers.

=== Managing the Eastern Court ===
In 305, Emperor Hui was forcibly relocated from Luoyang to Chang'an by Sima Yong. The imperial court was divided into two, with the Western Court in Chang'an and the Eastern Court in Luoyang. Liu Tun, as well as the prominent ministers Xun Fan and Zhou Fu, were left behind to manage politics in Luoyang on behalf of the emperor.

Later that year, the Prince of Donghai Sima Yue rallied the forces in the east to campaign against Sima Yong and bring Emperor Hui back to Luoyang. The general, Zhou Quan (周權), forged a proclamation to restore the deposed Empress Yang Xianrong in Luoyang but was foiled and killed. Sima Yong then issued an edict ordering her to commit suicide on the grounds that she was inciting rebellion. However, Liu Tun and his peers defended her, stating that she was under tight surveillance and was unaware of any plot. Sima Yong was furious and ordered his subordinate, Lü Lang (呂朗), to arrest Liu Tun, prompting him to flee to the Prince of Gaomi, Sima Lüe, in Qing province.

In 306, the Prefect of Jian County, Liu Bogen (劉伯根), became a bandit and raised an army in rebellion in Qing province. As Bogen led his followers towards the provincial capital, Linzi, Sima Lüe appointed Liu Tun as Grand Chief Controller and General Who Guards the Army before sending him to fight the rebels. However, Liu Tun was defeated and fled back to Luoyang.

In June that same year, Sima Yue returned Emperor Hui to the capital with his forces. Yang Xianrong, who was grateful to Liu Tun for saving her life, reported to the emperor on his deeds. As a result, Liu Tun was restored to his previous title, given the office of Household Counsellor with Golden Tassel, and once again appointed Colonel-Director of Retainers.

== Later life and career ==
=== War with Han-Zhao ===
The Jin remained in crisis as northern China came under threat from the Han-Zhao dynasty. During this time, Liu Tun's unnamed son got married, and because his wife had already died, it was tradition for his daughter-in-law to pay respects at her tomb while dozens of guests and relatives accompanied her to eat and drink. The Magistrate of Luoyang County, Wang Ling (王棱), was a trusted follower of Sima Yue but despised Liu Tun. With Han forces running rampant in the Hebei region, Wang Ling accused Liu Tun to Sima Yue that he was planning to defect, pointing out that the Han commander, Wang Mi, was from his hometown. Sima Yue believed him and sent his cavalry to chase after Liu Tun. When Liu Tun heard what was happening while on his way to his wife's tomb, he turned back to confront Sima Yue and accused him of being unrighteous. Sima Yue realized his mistake and regretted the whole ordeal.

In 309, during the reign of Emperor Huai of Jin, a large Han force was sent to attack Luoyang. Liu Tun was granted a tally and made General Who Pacifies the Army and Chief Controller of the city. After the Han was defeated and withdrew, he was appointed Supervisor of the Masters of Writing. By this point, Liu Tun had supervised the officials for many years and was popular among the people. Sima Yue had long had his suspicions of him, so, ostensibly as a promotion, he reduced Liu Tun's authority by making him Household Counsellor with Golden Tassel of the Right, acting Junior Tutor to the Crown Prince and Regular Mounted Attendant.

In 310, after Sima Yue brought the imperial army out from Luoyang, Emperor Huai of Jin appointed Liu Tun acting Minister of the Guards with "Specially Advanced". He was then made a Palace Attendant and, for the fifth and last time in his career, the Colonel-Director of Retainers.

=== Service under Wang Mi and death ===
In 311, the Han army once again attacked Luoyang, this time capturing the capital in what is now known as the Disaster of Yongjia. The invaders sacked the city and massacred the inhabitants. Wang Mi, one of the commanders of the attack, recognized Liu Tun as being from the same commandery, so he was able to escape execution.

After falling out with fellow general Liu Yao, Wang Mi left Luoyang, and Liu Tun followed him. Liu Tun advised him, "At present, the heroes are in contention with one another, and the Nine Provinces are in chaos. Those who attain great achievements are not tolerated in this world. General, ever since you've raised your army, there was no place you couldn't conquer and no battle you couldn't win, but now you are at odds with the Prince of Shi'an (Liu Yao). Think of the disaster that befell Wen Zhong and take Fan Li (Note: Both Wen Zhong and Fan Li served under Goujian of Yue. While Wen Zhong was forced to commit suicide after Yue had conquered Wu, Fan Li survived as he had resigned after Wu's fall.) as your teacher. Even if you have no ambition of becoming emperor, you should return east to your home province (Qing province) and observe the situation. Unite the realm or split it into three; how could Sun and Liu be wrong? As Kuai Tong had said, the general should plan ahead."

Wang Mi agreed with his words. Liu Tun further advised Wang Mi to summon his subordinate in Qing province, Cao Ni, to attack Shi Le together. Wang Mi dispatched Liu Tun to Cao Ni, but when he reached Dong'a, he was apprehended by Shi Le's cavalry. When Shi Le discovered Wang Mi's letter to Cao Ni in his pocket, he angrily had Liu Tun executed.
