= Jia Mi =

Jin dynasty minister and writer (died 300)

- 賈謐

Cavalier In Regular Attendance (散騎常侍)
- In office ?–?
- Monarch: Emperor Hui of Jin

General of the Rear Army (後軍將軍)
- In office ?–?
- Monarch: Emperor Hui of Jin

Custodian of the Private Library(秘書監)
- In office 296 – ?
- Monarch: Emperor Hui of Jin

Palace Attendant
- In office ?–?
- Monarch: Emperor Hui of Jin

Resident Instructor of the Eastern Palace (侍講東宮)
- In office 299 – ?
- Monarch: Emperor Hui of Jin

Personal details
- Born: Unknown (Note: While Jia Mi's birth year was not recorded, his mother Jia Wu was born in c.260; Jia Nanfeng's biography in Book of Jin recorded that Jia Wu was a year younger than Emperor Hui.) Xiangfen County, Shanxi
- Died: 300 Luoyang, Henan
- Relations: Jia Nanfeng (maternal aunt); Jia Chong (maternal grandfather); Guo Huai (maternal grandmother); Han Ji (paternal ancestor)
- Parents: Han Shou (birth father) Jia Limin (adoptive) (father); Jia Wu (mother)
- Occupation: Politician
- Courtesy name: Changyuan (長淵); Changshen (長深)
- Original name: Han Mi (韓謐)
- Peerage: Duke of Lu

Jia Mi (died 7 May 300 (Note: According to Sima Zhong's biography in Book of Jin, Jia Nanfeng was deposed as empress and her associates (including Jia Mi) were killed on the guisi day of the 4th month of the 1st year of the Yongkang era of his reign. This corresponds to 7 May 300 in the Julian calendar.)), courtesy name Changyuan (Note: Jia Mi's courtesy name is written as Changshen (長深) in the Book of Jin due to Tang dynasty naming taboo, as the word "yuan" (淵) is the same as the name of Tang's first emperor, Li Yuan (李淵). Lu Ji's poem "Reply to Jia Changyuan" (答贾长渊) was recorded in vol.24 of Wen Xuan; an annotation in the volume also cited the Book of Jin by Wang Yin, which indicated that Jia Mi's courtesy name was "Changyuan".), originally named Han Mi, was a Chinese politician of the Jin dynasty. He was the grandson of the Jin minister Jia Chong and nephew of Jin's de facto ruler between 291 and 300, Jia Nanfeng. Jia Mi was trusted with state affair by his aunt throughout her regency and wielded much influence over the Jin court. He was an extravagant minister, and under him, the Jin court became increasingly corrupted. Between 299 and 300, Jia Mi pushed his aunt for the removal and later execution of the Crown Prince, Sima Yu, a decision that would lead to the Jia clan's downfall. In May 300, Jia Mi was killed during Sima Lun's coup d'état.

== Life ==
=== Early life and background ===
Han Mi was born in Xiangling County, Pingyang Commandery (平陽, roughly modern Linfen, Shanxi). He was the grandson of the powerful minister, Jia Chong, through his mother, Jia Wu (260-300), who was married to an official named Han Shou (韓壽); Han Shou himself was a great-grandson of the Wei official Han Ji. Han Mi was described as having a beautiful appearance. Jia Chong died in May 282 without leaving a male heir. Because of this, Han Mi's grandmother, Guo Huai, decided to make Han Mi the adopted son of Chong's deceased eldest son and initial heir, Jia Limin (賈黎民). Han Mi thus changed his name to Jia Mi, and succeeded his grandfather's title of Duke of Lu.

=== Handling state affairs ===
In May 290, Emperor Wu of Jin died and was succeeded by his developmentally disabled son, Emperor Hui. Emperor Hui's wife, Jia Nanfeng, was Jia Mi's maternal aunt. Following her successful coup against her husband's regent, Yang Jun in April 291, Empress Jia appointed Jia Mi as one of the few people to handle state affairs alongside Jia Mo (賈模), Guo Zhang (Empress Jia's maternal relative), Sima Wei and Sima Yao (司馬繇; son of Sima Zhou). Soon, Sima Yao was sent into exile while Sima Wei was executed by Empress Jia later in July 291, leaving her family solely in power over the court. Both Jia Mi and Jia Nanfeng considered if they should remove the minister Zhang Hua as well, but through Pei Wei's consultation, they concluded that he was loyal to the Jia clan and pose no threat.

Shortly after the coup against Yang Jun, Jia Mi began meeting with many scholars-officials and filling his house with guests. Some of these scholar-officials began to closely associate themselves with Jia Mi, and they would be known as the "Twenty-Four Friends of Jingu". The closest of these associates were Shi Chong and Pan Yue, who constantly showered him with flattery. Purportedly, whenever the two spot Jia Mi and Guo Huai travelling together, they would get off their carriages, stand by the side of the road to bow down and pay their respects.

With his aunt ruling behind the scenes, Jia Mi's power was said to have exceeded that of a sovereign. He also had a very extravagant behaviour. The luxuriousness of his mansion was said to have surpassed that of his status. His possessions and clothing were usually rare and beautiful. He would also get the best singers and dancing girls to perform for him. Because of this, many throughout the state would rush to visit his residence whenever he held a grand banquet. Jia Mi's writing was praised by many during his time, so much so that he was compared to the Western Han dynasty writer, Jia Yi.

In 296, the Prince of Zhao, Sima Lun was called to the capital due to negligence over military affairs in Qinzhou and Yongzhou. At the advice of Sun Xiu, Sima Lun befriended Jia Mi along with the Empress and Guo Zhang to gain their trust. The same year, Guo Huai died, so Jia Mi temporarily resigned from his positions of Cavalier In Regular Attendance and General of the Rear Army to mourn.

Even before the mourning period had ended, he was appointed Custodian of the Private Library to revise the Jin dynasty's national history. During his tenure, Emperor Hui ordered for another discussion to decide on which date should serve as a division point between Jin and its predecessor, Cao Wei after a previous one failed to reach a conclusive agreement. Following some debate, Jia Mi chose to listen to the opinions of Zhang Hua, Wang Rong, Wang Yan, Yue Guang and others who supported his proposal that the first year of the Tai'shi era (during the reign of Emperor Wu) would serve as the starting year of the Jin dynasty.

In 299, the Master of Writing to the Ministry of Personnel, Liu Song (刘颂), established a system of nine classes to assess each minister's capability and how they should be rewarded or punished. However, this was never properly implemented due to the fact that Jia Mi and Guo Zhang opposed this as it limited their influences. Furthermore, it was not well-received by officials who wanted to advance their careers quicker through bribery. Under Jia Mi and Guo Zhang, bribery was very common in the Jin government as officials would present the two with gifts to curry their favour. A satirical article titled Discussion on the Divinity of Money (錢神論) was written by the hermit, Lu Bao (魯褒) to criticize this trend.

=== Conflict with Crown Prince Sima Yu ===
Crown Prince Sima Yu was despised by the Jia family due to the fact that he was not Jia Nanfeng's biological son. Jia Mi also disliked Sima Yu and refused to treat him with proper ceremony even after his grandmother told him to treat Yu kindly. Both Guo Huai and Sima Yu proposed that Yu marry with Jia Mi's sister to establish stronger ties between Yu and the Jia clan. However, this was turned down by Empress Jia and Jia Wu. Instead, the sisters wedded Sima Yu to Wang Yan's younger daughter and Jia Mi to Wang's elder daughter. Sima Yu was discontent at the fact that Jia Mi was given the more beautiful of the two.

In 299, Jia Mi was made a tutor to Sima Yu. However, Jia Mi still refused to show him respect. Sima Yu's uncle, the Prince of Chengdu, Sima Ying, confronted and scolded Jia Mi for his rudeness towards the Crown Prince. Jia Mi was angered by this, so he brought the matter to Empress Jia and arranged for Sima Ying to be moved away from Luoyang to Yecheng, assuringly to have him command the garrison. The hostile reception from Jia Mi caused Sima Yu to avoid him despite his Attendant, Pei Quan (裴權) warning him not to.

Jia Mi eventually took steps to remove Sima Yu from his title of Crown Prince. He told Empress Jia that Sima Yu would seek to destroy the Jia clan if he were to succeed Emperor Hui. He suggested to her that a more submissive and controllable Crown Prince should replace him at once. Empress Jia agreed with her nephew, so she began spreading degrading rumours of Sima Yu. She also started pretending to stuff objects such as hay under her cloths to give the assumption that she was pregnant, and also adopted Jia Mi's brother, Han Weizu (韓慰祖), as her own.

Finally, Sima Yu was made a commoner and later put under house arrest after he was tricked into writing a threatening edict against his father. Before he was escorted to Xuchang, an edict was made forbidding any minister to see him leave. However, some ministers like Jiang Tong and Wang Dun ignored it to bid their farewells. These ministers were thrown into jail in Luoyang and Henan, but the prisoners in Henan were deliberately released by Yue Guang. The official Sun Yan (孫琰) admonished Jia Mi to let the prisoners and Yue Guang off to prevent further exalting over Sima Yu. Jia Mi agreed and ordered the Prefect of Luoyang, Cao Shu (曹攄; great-grandson of Cao Xiu) to release the prisoners in Luoyang.

=== Sima Lun's coup and death ===
Many in the Jin court were unhappy with what had happened to Sima Yu. A group of conspirators flocked to Sima Lun who had the military capacity to stage a coup against the Jia clan. Lun agreed, but Sun Xiu told him to delay the plot in order to first get rid of Sima Yu, who they saw as a roadblock to their imperial ambition. Sun Xiu began to spread a rumour of a plot to place Sima Yu on the throne which reached Empress Jia. As Empress Jia began to worry, Sima Lun and Sun Xiu advised Jia Mi that he should convince his aunt to kill Sima Yu to destroy any hope of restoration. Jia Mi did so, and on April 27, 300, Sima Yu was assassinated.

On the day of the coup, Sima Lun presented a forged edict from Emperor Hui, denouncing Empress Jia, Jia Mi and their partisans and calling for the Empress's disposal. The Prince of Qi, Sima Jiong, had his own edict summoning Jia Mi to face his execution. Hearing this, Jia Mi fled under the Western Bells (西鍾), where he reportedly cried out, "O Empress, save me!". He was eventually caught and beheaded while his aunt was overthrown and later forced to commit suicide.

== Twenty-Four Friends of Jingu ==
The Twenty-Four Friends of Jingu (金谷二十四友) was an inner circle comprising celebrities in art and literature. All members were politically associated with Jia Mi and would usually socialize at Shi Chong's Jingu Garden (金谷園) in Luoyang. There, they would discuss current affairs, talk about literature, recite poetry and compose fus with one another. The group went into decline following Sima Lun's coup in 300. Apart from Jia Mi's execution, Shi Chong was also sentenced to death by Sun Xiu and had all his property confiscated later in 300. Other members who were purged by Sima Lun and Sun Xiu were Ouyang Jian, Pan Yue and Du Bin (杜斌). Some, like Lu Ji, sided with Sima Lun during the coup and served under his government. The group's associates were:

1. Shi Chong
2. Ouyang Jian (欧阳建)
3. Pan Yue
4. Lu Ji
5. Lu Yun
6. Miao Zhi (缪徵)
7. Du Bin (杜斌)
8. Zhi Yu (挚虞)
9. Zhuge Quan (諸葛銓; d. May 311) (Note: Zhuge Quan was an elder brother of Emperor Wu's concubine Zhuge Wan and a grandson of Zhuge Xu. Zhuge Quan was killed on 5 May 311, together with Wang Yan and many other Jin officials and princes by Shi Le in the aftermath of Sima Yue's death in April that year. Vol.87 of Zizhi Tongjian dated the event to the 4th month of that year, and did not record a specific day.)
10. Wang Cui (王粹) (Note: grandson of Wang Jun)
11. Du Yu (杜毓) (Note: grandson of Du Xi.)
12. Zou Jie (鄒捷)
13. Zuo Si
14. Cui Ji (崔基)
15. Liu Gui (劉瑰)
16. He Yu (和郁) (Note: grandson of He Qia)
17. Zhou Hui (周恢) (Note: maternal grandfather of Sima Tan.)
18. Qian Xiu (牵秀) (Note: nephew of Qian Hong)
19. Chen Zhen (陳眕)
20. Guo Zhang
21. Xu Meng (許猛)
22. Liu Na (劉訥; uncle of Liu Wei)
23. Liu Yu (brother of Liu Kun)
24. Liu Kun
