= Sun Xiu (Jin dynasty) =

Western Jin dynasty official and confidant of Sima Lun (died 301)

- 孫秀

Prefect of the Palace Secretariat (中書令)
- In office 300 – 301
- Monarch: Emperor Hui of Jin

Palace Attendant (侍中)
- In office 300 – 301
- Monarch: Emperor Hui of Jin/Sima Lun

General Who Upholds The State (輔國將軍)
- In office 300 – 301
- Monarch: Emperor Hui of Jin

Marshal to the Chancellor of State (相國司馬)
- In office 300 – 301
- Monarch: Emperor Hui of Jin

Chief of the Palace Secretariat (中書監)
- In office 301 – 301
- Monarch: Sima Lun

General of Agile Cavalry (票騎將軍)
- In office 301 – 301
- Monarch: Sima Lun

Personal details
- Born: Unknown (Note: Sun Xiu was already an adult when Sima Lun was Prince of Langya (February 266 - October 277). Thus, his birth year should be in the 250s or before.) Linyi, Shandong
- Died: 30 May, 301
- Relations: Sun Qi (clansman; maternal grandfather of Yang Xianrong); Sun En (descendant); Sun Tai (clansman and uncle of Sun En)
- Children: Sun Hui (281-301) (Note: According to Sima Lun's biography in Book of Jin, Sun Hui was 20 (by East Asian reckoning) when he married the Princess Hedong in 300.)
- Courtesy name: Junzhong (俊忠)

Sun Xiu (died 30 May 301), courtesy name Junzhong, was an official of the Jin dynasty. Sun was the favoured advisor to the Prince of Zhao, Sima Lun, who guided and supported him with advice in their rise to power. After Sima Lun took over the government in May 300, Sun Xiu was essentially in charge of running the state, as Lun delegated all affairs over to him. Sun helped Lun assume the throne in February 301, but a coalition against him led by Sima Jiong was formed shortly later. As the coalition approached Luoyang in May 301, Sun was killed in the capital during a coup led by disgruntled officials.

The prominent Jin dynasty rebel, Sun En, whose rebellion in December 399 caused great trouble for the Eastern Jin, was from Sun Xiu's clan.

== Early life and career ==
Sun Xiu was a native of Langya Commandery. For generations, his family followed the Way of the Five Pecks of Rice, and Sun himself was also a practitioner of this teaching. Sun grew to become a minor official in Langya, but it was said that he displayed poor behaviour. His superior at the time, Pan Yue, despised him because of this and had him flogged on numerous occasions.

Some time after Sima Lun became the Prince of Langya in February 266, Sun Xiu managed to win his trust through flattery and became an official under him. Sun would write documents on his behalf, and Lun greatly appreciated his literary talents. When Lun was made Prince of Zhao in October 277, Sun Xiu decided to change his family register to Zhao Commandery and was subsequently made an attendant.

After the ascension of Emperor Hui in May 290, Sima Lun was given military command over Qinzhou and Yongzhou. During his tenure, Lun's administration caused a series of tribal revolt which peaked in 296. Both Lun and Sun Xiu placed the blame on the Inspector of Yongzhou, Xie Xi (解系), (Note: The character "解" has different pronunciations: "jiě", "jiè" and "xiè". When used as a surname, it is pronounced as "xiè".) and the two sides sent petitions to the court accusing one another. Lun was eventually recalled to Luoyang, and was replaced by his half-brother Sima Rong (司馬肜). Xie also called for Sun Xiu's execution, believing that it would appeal to the tribes' demands. The minister, Zhang Hua considered it and told Sima Rong to prepare Sun's execution. However, an acquaintance of Sun Xiu, Xin Ran managed to convince Sima Rong not to carry out Zhang's orders. (Note: Xin Ran would later serve under Luo Shang and Liu Hong; when he recommended that Liu should attempt to break away from Jin, an angered Liu had him executed.)

== Sima Lun usurping the throne ==
=== Removing Sima Yu and Empress Jia ===
While in Luoyang, Sun advised Sima Lun to win the trust of Empress Jia (Jin's paramount leader at the time) as well as her family members Jia Mi and Guo Zhang (郭彰). Lun did so and quickly gained favour in the court. Lun was even confident enough to demand both Zhang Hua and Pei Wei's positions, but the two of them strongly refused to give their offices.

In early 300, a group of officials was angered by the Empress Jia's decision to remove the Crown Prince Sima Yu in February. They wanted to overthrow her, so they looked towards Sima Lun who possessed a strong army to stage a coup. They approached Sun Xiu, and Sun informed their plot to Lun. Lun agreed, and the plot was nearly set up. However, Sun advised Lun to wait a while longer until the Empress decided to kill Sima Yu, because he thought that Sima Yu would be detrimental to their future plans if he were to be restored to the throne. Sima Lun agreed and postponed the date of the coup. Sun sent a subordinate to spread a rumour of a plot to remove the empress and restore Sima Yu. Hearing this, Empress Jia sent her servants to eavesdrop around the palace, and her suspicions were soon confirmed. Lun and Sun then told Jia Mi that Sima Yu had to be killed in order to prevent his restoration. The Empress agreed with the idea, and Sima Yu was forced to commit suicide in April; when he refused to do so, he was killed.

Sima Lun launched his coup on the night of 7 May. That same day, Sun Xiu invited Zhang Hua to join him in overthrowing the empress, but Zhang refused. The coup was a success, and Empress Jia was placed under arrest. She was later forced to kill herself through poisoning.

=== Sima Lun's regency ===
After the removal of Empress Jia, Sima Lun began making plans with Sun Xiu to take the throne. Their political enemies, including Xie Xi, Zhang Hua and Pei Wei, were all executed. Sima Lun effectively made himself regent and issued a general amnesty. He also granted military and administrative power to his and Sun Xiu's allies. As Sima Lun had very little interest in running the court, he passed over his responsibilities to Sun Xiu by making him Prefect of the Palace Secretariat. All the state's affairs were handled by Sun without needing Lun's consent.

Sima Lun had appointed the Prince of Huainan, Sima Yun (司馬允; a son of Emperor Wu) to be an acting Protector of the Palace. However, both Yun and Lun were suspicious of one another. Lun decided to take away Yun's position of Protector by giving him a new position to strip him off his military power, but Yun pretended to be ill to avoid this. Sun Xiu sent the Imperial Secretary Liu Ji (劉機) to force him into accepting his new office. Liu arrested Yun's subordinates and presented an imperial edict as proof that Yun was going against Emperor Hui's orders. However, Yun knew by the writing that it was Sun Xiu who wrote the edict. Yun arrested Liu Ji and rebelled, but Sima Lun managed to quell his revolt and kill him.

After Sima Yun's death, Sun Xiu had more of his political enemies executed, using the failed coup as a pretext. He arrested Shi Chong, Ouyang Jian (歐陽建) and his former superior Pan Yue. Ouyang Jian supported Xie Xi in removing Lun from military command in Qinzhou and Yongzhou in 296. Shi Chong was Ouyang Jian's uncle, and he and Sun Xiu had a dispute over a woman named Lüzhu that Shi had an intimate relation with. All three men were executed along with their family members. Sun Xiu also had Sima Jiong sent away to Xuchang, fearing he would also rebel, as Jiong was not satisfied with his position despite his involvement in Empress Jia's removal.

=== Aiding Sima Lun in taking the throne ===
Following the aftermath of Sima Yun's attempted coup, Sun Xiu brought up the subject of granting Sima Lun the nine bestowments to the court. Many were afraid of opposing him, so they agreed, except for one official named Liu Song (劉頌). Sun's ally Zhang Lin (張林; great-grandson of Zhang Yan) accused Liu of being one of Zhang Hua's partisan. Zhang Lin was about to execute him, but Sun stopped him to prevent further enmity between their faction and members of the old court.

An edict was made granting Sima Lun the nine bestowments. Sun Xiu became Palace Attendant, General Who Upholds The State, and Marshal to the Chancellor of State. After that, Sun appointed Sima Rong to the newly-established position of Prime Minister (although Rong refused and never acknowledged his new office) and had his son, Sun Hui (孫會), marry Emperor Hui's daughter, the Princess of Hedong.

In early 301, Sima Lun and Sun Xiu had the general, Zhao Feng (趙奉) write a report which the pair claim was said by the spirit of Lun's father, Sima Yi, stating, "Sima Lun should enter the Western Palace at once." After preparations were made for his day of ascension, Sima Lun entered the Western Palace on an imperial carriage and assumed the throne on 3 February. After Emperor Hui abdicated, Sun Xiu was made Palace Attendant, Chief of the Palace Secretariat, and General of Agile Cavalry, with equal ceremonial to the Three Excellencies.

== Reign of Sima Lun ==
=== Consolidating power ===
At this point, Sun Xiu had complete control over the court and state. Sun began living in Sima Zhao's residence during Zhao's regency over Cao Wei. Sima Lun would always consult Sun on every matter, and edicts published out by Lun were always edited by Sun to fit his liking, unbeknownst to the emperor. The court was constantly undergoing changes as Sun appointed and removed officials overnight.

Meanwhile, Zhang Lin was not happy with what little he received after Lun's ascension, along with the fact that Sun had complete control over the court. He wrote a letter to Lun's Crown Prince, Sima Fu (司馬荂) to get his father to execute Sun, but Fu instead presented the letter to his father who in turn presented it to Sun. Sun told the emperor to have Zhang Lin killed, and so he did. To further cement his control, Sun had his allies assigned as advisors to the three most powerful princes at the time, Sima Jiong, Sima Ying and Sima Yong.

=== Anti-Sima Lun Coalition ===
Sima Lun's usurpation enraged Sima Jiong, who then formed a coalition to restore the deposed Emperor Hui. Sima Ying and Sima Yong soon joined him, causing Lun and Sun to panic. In response, the two forged a petition purportedly from Jiong, claiming he was struggling against bandit attacks and was weak and incompetent. They then divided their armies into two groups and sent them to confront Sima Jiong and Sima Ying.

Supposedly, Sima Lun and Sun Xiu began praying each day and had shamans predict favourable days to engage in battle. They also had their men travel to Mount Song in feathered clothing along with forging and publishing a letter that they claim was from the sage, Wang Qiao (王乔), which said that Lun was destined for a long reign. When news of Sima Jiong's victory reached Sun, he attempted to hide their defeat to the public by claiming in an edict that Jiong had already been captured and ordering the ministers to congratulate the general, Zhang Hong (張泓).

=== Death and aftermath ===
The situation for Sima Lun gradually worsened as Sima Ying won the Battle of Huangqiao and crossed the Yellow River to approach Luoyang. Officials in the capital were also beginning to openly express their frustration over Sima Lun and Sun Xiu, causing Sun to hole himself up in his office out of fear. Sun only moved to the office of the Masters of Writing after the Prince of Yiyang, Sima Wei (司馬威; a grandson of Sima Wang), called him to discuss strategy. They ordered a full conscription of men in Luoyang to follow Sima Lun in battle. However, the conscripts later urged Sima Wei to kill Sun; Wei refused by secretly fleeing to his residence.

The army from Huangqiao returned, and their generals immediately planned their next move with Sun Xiu. They thoroughly discussed, but could not come to a conclusive agreement. It was around this time when the general of the guards, Wang Yu (王輿), rebelled and stormed the palace. Wang personally led his group to attack Sun Xiu, blocking the southern gates of Sun's office. Sun and the generals attempted to flee, but they were all caught by Zhao Quan (趙泉) and beheaded to be made as examples.

Sima Lun was also arrested by the rebels. He was forced to write an edict stating, "I was misled by Sun Xiu and the others, and so I incurred the anger of the three Princes. I have already put Sun Xiu to death. Now I shall welcome the Retired Emperor back to the throne, and I myself shall live out my life tending a field." Emperor Hui was restored, and despite the last statement of his edict, Sima Lun was forced to commit suicide in the same manner as Empress Jia. Before his death, Sima Lun reportedly lamented that he was misled by Sun Xiu.
