= Han Ji =

Cao Wei state official (died 238)

- 韓曁

Minister over the Masses (司徒)
- In office 12 February – 10 April 238
- Monarch: Cao Rui

Palace Counsellor (太中大夫)
- In office 234 – 12 February 238
- Monarch: Cao Rui

Minister of Ceremonies (太常)
- In office 226 – 234
- Monarch: Cao Pi / Cao Rui

Commandant for Metals (司金都尉)
- In office ? – 226
- Monarchs: Emperor Xian of Han (until 220) / Cao Pi (from 220)
- Chancellor: Cao Cao (until 220)

Internuncio (謁者)
- In office ?–?
- Monarch: Emperor Xian of Han
- Chancellor: Cao Cao

Administrator of Laoling (樂陵太守)
- In office ?–?
- Monarch: Emperor Xian of Han
- Chancellor: Cao Cao

Personal details
- Born: 150s (Note: While Han Ji's birth year was not recorded, his biography in Sanguozhi recorded that he was in his 80s when he was appointed Minister over the Masses about two months before his death.) Fangcheng County, Henan
- Died: 10 April 238 (Note: The Sanguozhi recorded that Han Ji died on the gengzi day of the 4th month of the 2nd year in the Jingchu era of Cao Rui's reign. This date corresponds to 10 April 238 in the Gregorian calendar.)
- Children: Han Zhao; Han Yao
- Parent: Han Chun (father)
- Relatives: Xin of Han (ancestor); Han Shu (grandfather)
- Occupation: Politician
- Courtesy name: Gongzhi (公至)
- Posthumous name: Marquis Gong (恭侯)
- Peerage: Marquis of Nanxiang Village (南鄉亭侯)

Han Ji (died 10 April 238), courtesy name Gongzhi, was a Chinese politician who served in the state of Cao Wei during the Three Kingdoms period of China. He previously served under the warlords Liu Biao and Cao Cao during the late Eastern Han dynasty.

== Early life ==
Han Ji was from Duyang County (堵陽縣), Nanyang Commandery (南陽郡), which is present-day Fangcheng County, Henan. His ancestor was Han Xin (a.k.a. King Xin of Han), one of the rulers of the Eighteen Kingdoms in the transition from the Qin dynasty to the Western Han dynasty. His grandfather Han Shu (韓術) and father Han Chun (韓純) served as the Administrators (太守) of Hedong Commandery (河東郡; around present-day Yuncheng, Shanxi) and Nan Commandery (南郡; around present-day Jingzhou, Hubei) respectively in the Eastern Han dynasty.

When Han Ji was still young, Chen Mao (陳茂), a wealthy and influential man also from Duyang County, framed his father and elder brother(s) for committing capital offences. Han Ji's father and brother(s) were arrested and executed as a result. Han Ji remained silent over the injustice suffered by his family while secretly plotting to take revenge against Chen Mao. He found employment, saved up his earnings, and used the money to hire assassins to assist him in taking revenge. They tracked down Chen Mao, killed him, cut off his head and placed it as an offering at the tomb of Han Ji's father. Han Ji became famous after this incident.

Han Ji was later nominated as a xiaolian (civil service candidate) and offered a job in the office of the Minister of Works, but he rejected the offer. When chaos broke out throughout China in the 180s, he adopted a fake identity and went to live in the countryside of Luyang County (魯陽縣; present-day Lushan County, Henan). During this time, when he heard that the villagers were planning to become bandits because life was getting too hard for them, he used his personal wealth to host a feast for the village leaders and managed to convince them to abandon their plan to become bandits.

Sometime between 189 and 192, when the warlord Yuan Shu controlled Nanyang Commandery, he heard of Han Ji and summoned Han Ji to serve under him. Han Ji refused and went into hiding in the hills near Shandu County (山都縣; northwest of present-day Xiangyang, Hubei) to avoid Yuan Shu. When Liu Biao, the Governor of Jing Province (covering present-day Hubei and Hunan) tried to recruit him as a subordinate, Han Ji fled further south to Chanling County (孱陵縣; west of present-day Gong'an County, Hubei) to evade Liu Biao. He soon became a popular and respected figure among the locals; Liu Biao was very resentful when he heard about it. Han Ji, fearing that Liu Biao would retaliate against him, reluctantly agreed to serve under Liu Biao, who appointed him as the Chief (長) of Yicheng County (宜城縣; in present-day Xiangyang, Hubei).

== Service under Cao Cao ==
Following Liu Biao's death in 208, his younger son and successor Liu Cong surrendered and relinquished his governorship of Jing Province to the warlord Cao Cao, who controlled the figurehead Emperor Xian and Han central government. Cao Cao recruited Han Ji to serve in the office of the Imperial Chancellor (丞相), the position he held, and later promoted him to serve as the Administrator (太守) of Laoling Commandery (樂陵郡; around present-day Yangxin County, Shandong).

Han Ji was subsequently reassigned to be an Internuncio (謁者) in charge of the cast iron industry. In older times, the bellows of every blast furnace was operated by 100 draught horses. Later, the industry switched to using manual labour. When Han Ji took charge of the industry, he saw that manual labour was too inefficient and required too much manpower. He then introduced the use of hydraulic power to operate the bellows, a method devised by Du Shi in the early Eastern Han dynasty. After the changes, the amount of cast iron produced by the industry increased by three times as compared to before. Han Ji supervised the cast iron industry for seven years and performed well in office as the production levels of cast iron remained high, thus ensuring that Cao Cao's army had a steady supply of weapons and equipment. The Han imperial court issued an edict to praise Han Ji for his excellent performance and promote him to the position of Commandant for Metals (司金都尉), placing him just below the Nine Ministers in the Han bureaucratic hierarchy.

== Service in Wei ==
In late 220, Cao Cao's son and successor, Cao Pi, usurped the throne from Emperor Xian, ended the Eastern Han dynasty, and established the state of Cao Wei with himself as the new emperor. After his coronation, Cao Pi enfeoffed Han Ji as the Marquis of Yicheng Village (宜城亭侯).

In 226, Cao Pi promoted Han Ji to the position of Minister of Ceremonies (太常), changed his peerage from "Marquis of Yicheng Village" to "Marquis of Nanxiang Village" (南鄉亭侯) and awarded him a marquisate of 200 taxable households.

Around the time, as Cao Pi had only recently designated Luoyang as the imperial capital of Wei, there were many imperial ceremonies, customs, rituals and protocol-related matters which had yet to be finalised. Besides, the ancestral temple of the Cao family was still in Ye (in present-day Handan, Hebei), the capital of the former vassal Kingdom of Wei during the Eastern Han dynasty. After assuming office as Minister of Ceremonies, Han Ji wrote a memorial urging the central government to construct a new ancestral temple in Luoyang and relocate the ancestral tablets from Ye to Luoyang, so that the emperor and his subjects could properly pay respects to their ancestors. Throughout his eight-year-long tenure as Minister of Ceremonies, Han Ji came up with a new set of ceremonies, customs, rituals and protocol for the Cao Wei state, and abolished old practices from the Han dynasty which were no longer relevant. He retired in 234 due to poor health and was given an honorary position as a Palace Counsellor (太中大夫).

On 12 February 238, (Note: The Sanguozhi recorded that Han Ji was appointed Minister over the Masses on the guimao day of the 2nd month of the 2nd year of the Jingchu era in Cao Rui's reign. This date corresponds to 12 February 238 in the Gregorian calendar.) during the reign of Cao Pi's successor Cao Rui, the imperial court issued an edict which read: "Palace Counsellor Han Ji has bathed himself in virtue and conducted himself with integrity and honesty. Although he is already over 80 years old, he still commits himself firmly to upholding righteousness and moral principles. This is what it means to become more principled and more faithful as one grows older. He is hereby conferred the appointment of Minister over the Masses."

== Death ==
Han Ji died on 10 April 238, about two months after he was appointed Minister over the Masses. Before his death, he said that he wanted to have a simple funeral: to be dressed in the clothes he normally wore when he was still alive; to be a simple grave with nothing but soil covering his coffin; to be buried with simple funeral artefacts made of earthenware. He also wrote a memorial to the imperial court to convey his wishes for a simple funeral, even though he knew that according to custom he would be accorded a more elaborate funeral because of his ministerial appointment. After reading Han Ji's memorial, Cao Rui praised him for his humility and gave an order for Han Ji to be given the simple funeral in accordance with his final wishes. He also awarded Han Ji a set of funeral artefacts, a set of court robes, and a ceremonial sword made of jade, in addition to honouring him with the posthumous title "Marquis Gong" (恭侯).

== Descendants ==
Han Ji's first son, Han Zhao (韓肇), inherited his father's peerage and became the next Marquis of Nanxiang Village (南鄉亭侯). When he died, the peerage was passed on to his son, Han Bang (韓邦), whose courtesy name was Changlin (長林). Han Bang was known for being studious and talented since young. During the reign of Emperor Wu in the Jin dynasty, Han Bang served as the Prefect (令) of Yewang County (野王縣; present-day Qinyang, Henan). After showing good performance in office, he was promoted to be the Administrator (太守) of Xincheng Commandery (新城郡; around present-day Fang County, Hubei). However, he was executed by Emperor Wu after the emperor learnt that he abused his authority by illegally helping his former subordinates from Yewang County get promoted to higher positions in Xincheng Commandery.

Han Ji's second son, Han Yao (韓繇), served as the Administrator of Gaoyang Commandery (高陽郡; around present-day Gaoyang County, Hebei). Han Yao's son, Han Hong (韓洪), served in the Imperial Censorate. Han Hong's son, Han Shou (韓壽), had the courtesy name Dezhen (德貞).

Like his great-grandfather Han Ji, Han Shou was known for conducting himself with virtue and integrity. He was appointed as a Regular Mounted Attendant (散騎常侍) after Emperor Hui of the Jin dynasty came to the throne, and was subsequently promoted to the position of Intendant of Henan (河南尹). After he died of illness, the Jin government posthumously awarded him the appointment of General of Agile Cavalry (驃騎將軍). Han Shou married Jia Chong's daughter, Jia Wu, and had a son, Han Mi (韓謐), with her. As Jia Chong died without any sons to succeed him, his peerage was passed on to Han Mi, his maternal grandson. Han Mi was appointed as Palace Attendant by the Jin government as soon as he reached adulthood, and was known for being arrogant but more talented than his father Han Shou. (Note: Han Mi, later known as Jia Mi, had his own biography in vol.40 of the Tang-era Book of Jin.)

Han Shou had another son, Han Wei (韓蔚), who also had quite a reputation in the Jin government. Han Wei was executed by the prince Sima Lun, probably during the fall of his brother and their maternal aunt Jia Nanfeng during Sima Lun's coup in 300. With Han Wei's death, Han Ji's family line came to an end.

== See also ==
- Lists of people of the Three Kingdoms
