= Pan Yue =

Pan Yue may refer to:

- Pan Yue (poet) (247–300), Western Jin dynasty poet
- Pan Yue (politician) (born 1960), Chinese politician
