= Guo Zhang =

Jin dynasty (266–420) politician

- 郭彰

General of the Guards (衛將軍)
- In office ?–?
- Monarch: Emperor Hui of Jin

Personal details
- Born: Unknown Yangqu County, Shanxi
- Died: between 299 and 7 May 300 Luoyang, Henan
- Courtesy name: Shuwu (叔武)
- Peerage: Marquis of Guanjun County (冠軍縣侯)
- Posthumous name: Lie (烈)

Guo Zhang (died between 299 and 7 May 300) was a politician of the Western Jin. He was a maternal relative of Empress Jia Nanfeng, and after she took power in 291, he and Empress Jia's nephew, Jia Mi, wielded significant power over the imperial court. Guo Zhang and Jia Mi were known by the people of their time as "Jia-Guo" (賈郭), and under the two, the Jin government became increasingly corrupt.

== Life ==
=== Early career ===
Guo Zhang was a member of the Guo clan of Yangqu County, Taiyuan Commandery. He was a cousin (or an uncle, which, if the case, means that he was also the brother of the Cao Wei general Guo Boji) of Guo Huai (郭槐), the wife of the prominent Jin minister, Jia Chong. He and Guo Huai were described as close as brother and sister, and he was also on good terms with Jia Chong. He successively served as Regular Mounted Attendant and Master of Writing.

On one occasion, Emperor Wu of Jin wanted to appoint one of Guo Zhang's relatives, Guo Qi (郭琦), as an Assistant Gentleman Editor, so Emperor Wu asked Guo Zhang for his thoughts on the matter. Guo Zhang hated Guo Qi, so he simply replied, "I do not know". Still, Emperor Wu insisted on giving Guo Qi the position, saying, "If one speaks like a minister, then he is capable of becoming a minister, even if he is a son of Wuhuan. I believe he is worthy of the office."

=== Service under Empress Jia ===
Emperor Wu died in May 290, and was succeeded by his developmentally disabled son, Emperor Hui of Jin. Emperor Hui's wife and Guo Huai's daughter, Jia Nanfeng, became empress as a result. Guo Zhang was appointed as Guard General of the Right. In 291, Empress Jia successfully overthrew her co-regents Yang Jun, Sima Liang and Wei Guan, and began ruling Jin behind her husband. Guo Zhang was one of the few people she entrusted in running the state, and together with Empress Jia's nephew, Jia Mi, the two became the most influential figures within the Jin court. Guo Zhang's mansion was often filled with guests, and he was also one of the Twenty-Four Friends of Jingu (金谷二十四友); an inner circle of celebrities consisting of Jia Mi's closest associates.

When Empress Jia deposed Yang Jun, she had done so with the help of the Prince of Chu, Sima Wei. In July 291, Sima Wei's subordinate, Qi Sheng (岐盛), urged him to raise his army and execute Guo Zhang and Jia Mi. Sima Wei was undecided, and before he could act, Empress Jia had him arrested and executed. Guo Zhang eventually became General of the Guards and given the title of Marquis of Guanjun County.

In c.November 295, a fire broke out in the imperial armory in Luoyang. At the time, Guo Zhang had a hundred men under him, but instead of lending them to put out the fire, he was more interested in protecting his own property. One minister, Liu Tun, severely questioned him for his action. Guo Zhang angrily said, "Sir, I can easily cut off your frontal bone if I wanted to!" Liu Tun replied, "How dare you use favour to act like a tyrant! Are you going to cut the Son of Heaven's faguan as well?" Liu Tun attempted to remove Guo Zhang from office, and Guo Zhang was unable to defend himself. Despite everyone else making excuses on behalf of Guo Zhang, Liu Tun refused to relent. After the incident, Guo Zhang was said to have become less extravagant and led a more simple life.

As Guo Zhang and Jia Mi dominated the Jin court, the two were often collectively referred to as "Jia-Guo". Under the two, the court was rampant with corruption and bribery, with many officials competing with each other for wealth. A hermit named Lu Bao (魯褒) wrote a satirical article title "Discussion on the Divinity of Money" (錢神論) to criticize the Jia-Guo administration. In 299, when the minister Liu Song (刘颂) proposed a system of nine classes to assess each minister's capability and how they should be rewarded or punished, Guo Zhang and Jia Mi vehemently opposed it as it would diminish their influence. The two were backed by several officials, so the system was not implemented.

Guo Zhang died in an unknown year, and he was posthumously given the name "Lie" (烈). In May 300, Empress Jia and her partisans were purged following a coup by the Prince of Zhao, Sima Lun, who had previously won the trust of Guo Zhang and Jia Mi after he moved to Luoyang in 296.
