= Yue Guang =

Chinese calligrapher

- Born: 247 or before (Note: Since Yue Guang was 7 when he met Xiahou Xuan, he should be born in or before 247 as Xiahou Xuan died in March 254.); Nanyang
- Died: 29 February 304
- Other name: Yue Yanfu
- Occupations: Calligrapher, politician
- Known for: One of the Qingtan leaders in Western Jin

Yue Guang (Chinese: 樂廣; died 29 February 304), courtesy name Yanfu (彥輔), was a Chinese calligrapher, politician who was one of the pure conversation leaders in the Jin Dynasty, and an individual with a literary reputation by others at that time.

Yue Guang was born to a poor family and lived in the lowest social class, but was appreciated by several high-ranking government officials due to his moral integrity and ability in his childhood. With their assistance, Yue Guang began his political career and served as assistant minister, archer coordinator, and tutor of the crown prince. He was later involved in a complicated political struggle, and his leader lost trust in him because of his identity as the father-in-law of another political party’s leader.

== Historical background ==
In the late period of Cao Wei, politics became increasingly corrupt and class contradictions became more apparent. At the same time, there was a confrontation and struggle between the two groups led by Cao Shuang and Sima Yi, which the latter won. In the second year of Xianxi (265), Sima Yan forced the last emperor of Cao Wei, Cao Huan, to abdicate the throne and establish the Jin dynasty.

Western Jin (266-316) is one of two main divisions in the history of Jin, which was established by Sima Yan, posthumously known as Emperor Wu of Jin. After the kingdom of Wu was eliminated to improve the poor situation left by the war, Sima Yan took Luoyang as his capital and adopted a series of measures throughout the country, such as focusing on agricultural production and protecting the interests of the gentry. These measures contributed to freeing the people from the war and making the country work on development. While emphasizing the development of production, Sima Yan strongly opposed extravagance and advocated frugality. Yue Guang was promoted to a higher position during that period.

After a period of stable development, the royal family of Western Jin gradually decayed. Sima Yan became immersed in his achievements and forgot what he advocated. In order to dominate the country and bolster the power of the Sima clan, most of his relatives were awarded different lands, which resulted in the War of the Eight Princes, since every prince wanted to rule the whole country rather than only part of it. A succession of crises caused higher taxes and destroyed the social economy. However, the ruling classes were still busy contending for power and after the War of the Eight Princes, the hidden class contradiction broke out. Eventually, the common folk began to revolt against the domination. At the same time, with the uprising of the five barbarians, Western Jin lost control of northern China.

== Lifetime ==
=== Early life ===
When Yue Guang was eight (by East Asian reckoning), his father, Yue Fang, served as staff officer of Xiahou Xuan. After being familiar with him, Xiahou Xuan said to his father, "Yue Guang will become a famous officer in the future, it is rare to behave so decently in his age."

After his father's early death, Yue Guang was left poor and alone. He devoted his energy and time to studying, but was unknown at that time. He was modest and never looked forward to enjoying luxury, which helped him earn a reputation for being frugal and hard-working. In addition, he was good at analysing things with terse and lively language, but he always kept silent while being asked something he did not understand. He was later recommended as a scholar and invited to become Wei Guan's sons’ tutor because of his reputation.

=== Political career ===
Yue Guang served as county magistrate of Yuan City and was promoted to being the princess's tutor, then later the master of Henan. Finally, he served as assistant minister. While evaluating employees, Yue Guang preferred to point out their advantages first, then the disadvantages would be realized by themselves without mentioning it. He had been regarded as one of the leaders of Qingtan in Western Jin and famous for his literary reputation all over the country.

In the first year of Yongkang (300 AD), Sima Yu, known as the crown prince Minhuai, was deposed and detained in Jinyong City. The imperial court forbade the old minister of the prince from seeing him. Those people could do nothing but sigh indignantly, but eventually, all of them decided to violate the decree and went to worship, and the government clerk arrested them and sent them to jail. However, those who were sent to prison in Henan, which was governed by Yue Guang at that time, were released by him, which was considered illegal. One of the assistant prosecutors said to the manager, "The reason why the prince was deposed is he overused his authority and enjoyed luxury every day. Now those old ministers risked bidding farewell to the prince, It seemed that the evil prince deserved to be missed. If they are punished severely, this thing will be circulated widely, and in people’s eyes, it looks like those people were attracted by the virtue of Sima Yu, which is an absolute misunderstanding, so it is better to release them like Yue Guang." After listening to his opinions, Yue Guang was not punished.

Yue Guang was promoted to the Ministry of the Department of Shang Shu later. He took over the position of Wang Rong, who recommended him as a scholar at the beginning of his political career.

=== End of life ===
Sima Ying, the prince of Chengdu, was Yue Guang’s son-in-law, but Yue Guang worked for Sima Ai, the prince of Changsha. In 303, during the War of the Eight Princes, Sima Ying was going to attack Sima Ai in Luoyang, who was afraid that Yue Guang would betray him due to his relationship with Sima Ying. Despite his protests, Yue Guang could not convince Sima Ai otherwise, which added to his mental pressure and resulted in some psychological problems. Eventually, Yue Guang passed away in 304. (Note: Sima Ai himself would be killed in March 304, less than a month after Yue's death.)

== Family ==
Yue Guang’s father was called Yue Fang; he served as a staff officer under Xiahou Xuan but he died early.

Yue Guang had three sons:

- Yue Kai, courtesy name Hongxu, who served as an adviser to Sima Jiong;
- Yue Zhao, courtesy name Hongmao, who worked with the Prince of Donghai, Sima Yue.
- The youngest son, Yue Mo, courtesy name Hongfan, who served as a general, attacking the five barbarians.

Yue Guang had two daughters. One of them married the Prince of Chengdu, Sima Ying, and the other one married Wei Jie, a grandson of Wei Guan, who was famous with his literary talent.

While Sima Ai suspected that Yue Guang would be rebellious during the War of the Eight Princes, Yue Guang explained "[i]t [was] impossible to sacrifice [his] three sons’ lives for one of [his] daughters."

== Anecdotes and evaluation ==
Yue Guang was confused as to why one of his close friends had not visited him for a long time. His friend explained that he felt extremely uncomfortable after having dinner with Yue Guang in his house since he thought there was a snake in his cup while drinking. After checking his house, he did not find any snake, but it appeared that the bow behind him was reflected in his cup and vaguely looked like a snake. Yue Guang dissuaded his friend's fears by taking the bow down in front of him.

A legend said that there was a monster in Henan palace and the previous masters of Henan were all afraid of living in the palace. Yue Guang did not believe that and tried to find out the truth after he was promoted to master of Henan. At midnight, he stayed in the palace with some soldiers and the door suddenly opened following some harsh and menacing noise, everyone was scared at that time except Yue Guang. He looked around and found a small hole in the wall. After the wall was broken, a little fox jumped out.

Although Yue Guang was well-liked, he did not accept the behavior of some of his peers. When Wang Cheng and Hu Wufuzhi served as high officials, they almost did whatever they wanted, such as streaking and insulting others. Yue Guang disagreed and said "They are able to find happiness in Qingtan. Why do they have to do that?"
