= Sima Yun =

Western Jin Prince Zhongzhuang of Huainan (272-300)

Sima Yun 司馬允

Prince of Huainan (淮南王)
- Reign: 22 December 289 - c.September 300

Prince of Puyang (濮阳王)
- Reign: 5 October 277 - 22 December 289
- Born: 272
- Died: c.September 300; Luoyang, Henan
- Issue: three sons, including Sima Yu (司马郁; Prince of Qin) and Sima Di (司马迪; Prince of Han)
Names
- Family name: Sima (司馬); Given name: Yun (允); Courtesy name: Qindu (钦度)
Posthumous name
- Zhongzhuang (忠壮)
- House: House of Sima
- Father: Emperor Wu of Jin
- Mother: Lady Li

Sima Yun (simplified Chinese: 司马允; traditional Chinese: 司馬允; 272 - c.September 300), courtesy name Qindu (钦度), posthumously known as Prince Zhongzhuang of Huainan, was an imperial prince of the Western Jin dynasty, and a son of Emperor Wu of Jin. Besides his heritage, Sima Yun was best known for his failed uprising against Sima Lun, then regent of Yun's half-brother Emperor Hui.

== Background and life under Emperor Wu ==
Sima Yun was born to Emperor Wu and his concubine Lady Li in 272; his full younger brother was Sima Yan (司马晏; 281 - 14 July 311), Prince Xiao of Wu and father to the future Emperor Min of Jin. Like many of Emperor Wu's sons, Sima Yun was made an imperial prince in October 277; he was about five at the time and so remained in the imperial capital Luoyang. His first princely title was Prince of Puyang; his princely title was changed to Prince of Huainan in December 289, just about five months before Emperor Wu's death in May 290. At the same time, he was also made Chief Controller of Yangzhou (扬州) and Jiangzhou (江州).

== During Emperor Hui's reign ==
Sima Yun's half-brother Emperor Hui was developmentally disabled; his reign saw a series of regents who ruled on his behalf. Sima Yun's activities during the regencies of Yang Jun, Yun's granduncle Sima Liang and Wei Guan (who were co-regents), and Emperor Hui's wife Empress Jia Nanfeng, were poorly documented.

After Emperor Hui's crown prince Sima Yu was deposed in February 300, there were proposals to make Sima Yun crown prince. However, court officials did not agree to the choice of crown prince. Empress Jia then ordered Sima Yu's assassination in April. The crown prince's fate lost Jia much support, and she was soon overthrown by Emperor Hui's grand-uncle Sima Lun in May.

In c.September 300, after Lun attempted to take his military authority away, Sima Yun rebelled against Lun with only 700 men in Luoyang. Lun was nearly killed in the fighting, but one of his supporters Fu Yin (伏胤) pretended to defect to Yun and killed him, ending his rebellion. His three sons, including Sima Yu (司马郁; Prince of Qin) and Sima Di (司马迪; Prince of Han) were also killed with him, and several thousands were implicated and executed. (Note: As Sima Yun's son Sima Yu was also killed with him, the title of Prince of Qin was later granted to Sima Ye (the later Emperor Min of Jin).)

== Sources ==
- di Cosmo, Nicola (2009), Military Culture in Imperial China, Harvard University Press
- Fang, Xuanling, Book of Jin (Jin Shu).
- Sima, Guang, Comprehensive Mirror in Aid of Governance (Zizhi Tongjian)
