= Pan Yue (poet) =

Chinese fu poet

- Chinese: 潘岳
Transcriptions
Standard Mandarin
- Hanyu Pinyin: Pān Yuè
- Wade–Giles: P'an^{1} Yüeh^{4}
- IPA: [pʰán ɥê]
Wu
- Romanization: Phoẽ Ngoʔ
Yue: Cantonese
- Yale Romanization: Pūn Ngohk
- Jyutping: Pun^{1} Ngok^{6}
- IPA: [pʰun˥ ŋɔk̚˨]
Southern Min
- Tâi-lô: Phuann Ga̍k

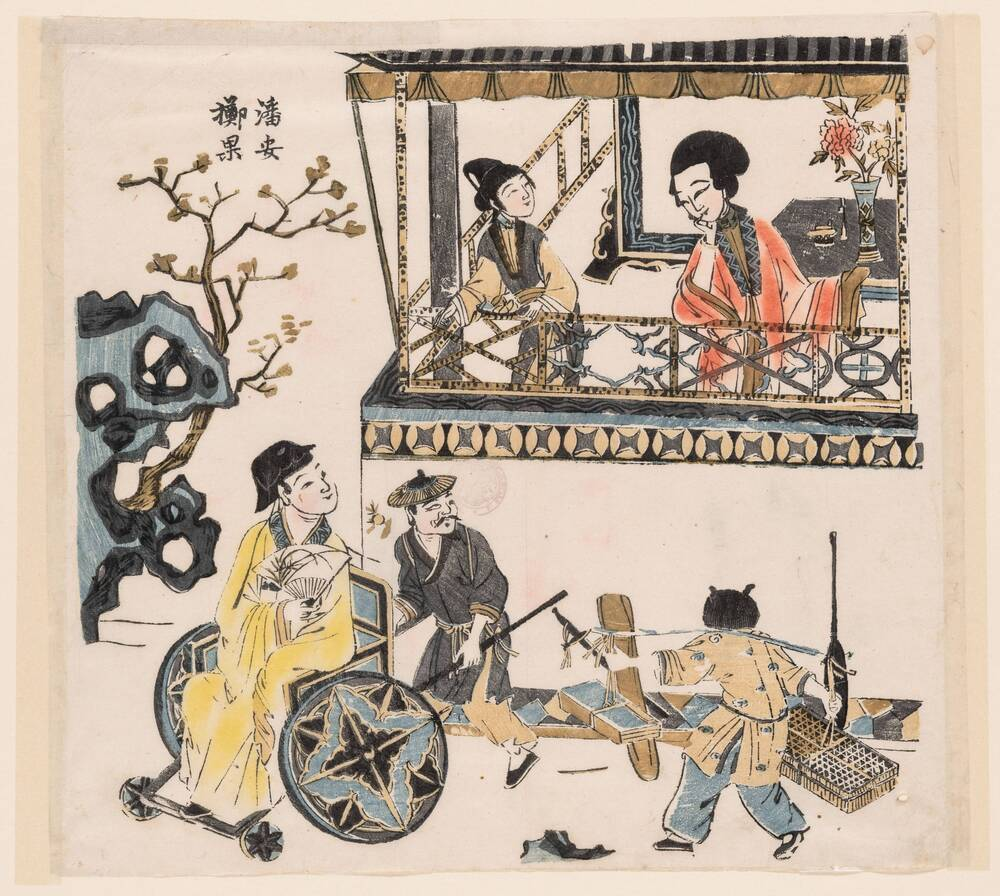
Throwing Fruits to Pan An, Qing era woodblock

Pan Yue (Chinese: 潘岳; 247–300), courtesy name Anren (安仁), was a prominent Chinese fu poet in the Western Jin dynasty. He is popularly referred to as Pan An (潘安) and was well known for his good looks from a young age. "Pan An" has become the Chinese byword for handsome men.

== Background and family ==
Pan's family was from Zhongmou (modern Zhongmu County, Henan). His grandfather Pan Jin (Chinese: 潘瑾) was a governor of Anping (modern Jizhou, Hebei) during the Eastern Han dynasty, and his father Pan Pi (Chinese: 潘芘) served as governor of Langye (near modern Linyi, Shandong). Pan was known as somewhat of a child prodigy in his youth and was known throughout their village in Gong County, Henan for his keen mind and talent. Pan's uncle Pan Xu (Chinese: 潘勗; c.early 160s - 215) (Note: When annotating Wei Ji's (father of Wei Guan) biography in Records of the Three Kingdoms, Pei Songzhi cited the Wenzhang Zhi and Ni Bie Zhuan, which recorded that Pan Ni was a grandson of Pan Xu, while Pan Yue was a congfu of Pan Ni. It is likely that Pan Xu and Pan Yue's father Pan Pi were cousins.) wrote the imperial edict when Cao Cao was granted the Nine bestowments. (Note: The edict (册魏公九锡文) was included in vol.35 of Wen Xuan. Pan Xu was credited under his courtesy name Yuanmao (元茂).)

== Life ==
In late 266, around age 19, Pan moved to the imperial capital at Luoyang and served as an assistant in the Ministry of Works. Despite Pan's ability and handsome appearance, he was unable to advance his career for the next decade. In the early 270s, Pan worked as an aide to Jia Chong, a high-ranking official under Emperor Wu of Jin. By late 278, Pan had become completely disillusioned with official service and retired to the Pan family home in Gong county. Pan came out of retirement around 282 to serve as magistrate of Meng county (modern Mengzhou) north of the Yellow River from Luoyang. He returned to Luoyang in 287 to serve in official positions before being dismissed in 290 for an unknown offense. Around 295, Pan returned to the capital for a final time to serve under official Jia Mi (Chinese: 賈謐). Jia was assassinated in a coup in May 300, and Pan was falsely accused of plotting in a related rebellion against the throne. (Note: Pan's biography in Book of Jin recorded that he was accused of treason by Sun Xiu, a confident of Sima Lun (Sima Yi's youngest son). In their younger days, Pan had Sun whipped on several occasions.) Pan and his entire family were subsequently arrested and executed, along with Shi Chong and Shi's family.

The Book of Jin, compiled during the Tang dynasty, had the following record on Pan Yue's looks:

(Pan) Yue was handsome in appearance and bearing... When he was young, he often strolled about outside Luoyang, holding a slingshot under the arm. Women who met him all surrounded him by hands and threw fruits in his chariot, so when he returned, his chariot was full of fruits.

His most famous works are his three poems to his dead wife, which contain the well-known lines:

We were a pair of birds nesting in the woods.
One woke in the morning to find himself alone.

— "Poems Lamenting Her Death" (Dào Wáng Shī 悼亡詩)
Translation:

如彼翰林鳥，
雙棲一朝只。
