= Emperor Hui of Jin =

Emperor of the Jin Dynasty from 290 to 307

Emperor Hui of Jin 晉惠帝
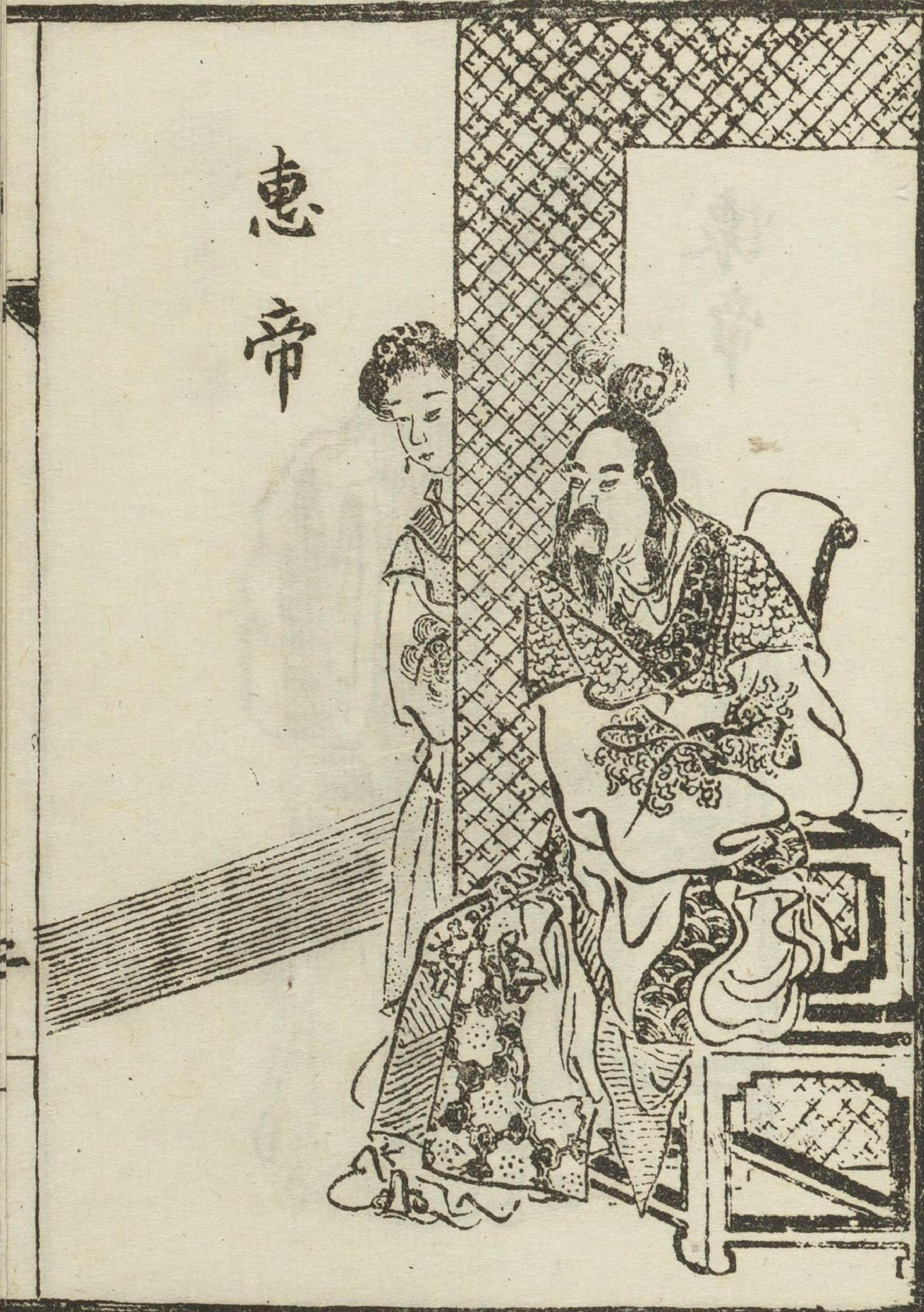

Emperor of the Jin Dynasty
- 1st Reign: 16 May 290 – 3 February 301
- Predecessor: Emperor Wu
- Successor: Sima Lun
- 2nd Reign: 1 June 301 – 8 January 307
- Predecessor: Sima Lun
- Successor: Emperor Huai

Crown Prince of the Jin Dynasty
- Tenure: c.February 267 (Note: Both Emperor Wu's biography in Jin Shu and vol.79 of Zizhi Tongjian indicated that Sima Zhong was made crown prince on the ding'mao day of the 1st month of the 3rd year of the Tai'shi era. However, that month did not have a ding'mao day; the month corresponds to 11 Feb to 12 Mar 267 in the Julian calendar. The nearest ding'mao days are in the month before and after. It is possible that the correct month was the 2nd (二; compare and contrast with the character "正" [zheng]) month; the corresponding date in the Julian calendar is 5 April 267.) – 16 May 290

Taishang Huang (太上皇)
- Tenure: 3 February 301 – 1 June 301
- Born: 259
- Died: 8 January 307 (aged 46–47)
- Consorts: Lady Jia Nanfeng; Yang Xianrong of Taishan
- Issue: Sima Yu; Princess Hedong; Princess Linhai; Princess Shiping; Princess Hongnong; Lady Aixian
Names
- Family name: Sima (司馬; sī mǎ); Given name: Zhong (衷; zhōng)
Posthumous name
- Full: Xiaohui (孝惠; xiào huì) literary meaning: "filial and benevolent" Short: Hui (惠; huì) "benevolent"
- Father: Emperor Wu
- Mother: Empress Wuyuan

Emperor Hui of Jin (simplified Chinese: 晋惠帝; traditional Chinese: 晉惠帝; pinyin: Jìn Huì Dì; Wade–Giles: Chin Hui-ti; 259 – 8 January 307 (Note: According to Emperor Hui's biography in Book of Jin, he died aged 48 (by East Asian reckoning) on the gengwu day of the 11th month of the 1st year of the Guangxi era of his reign. This corresponds to 8 Jan 307 in the Julian calendar. Vol.86 of Zizhi Tongjian had the same death date and added that he was poisoned during the night of the ji'si day, i.e. the day before (7 Jan 307). Emperor Hui's biography also indicated that he was 9 (by East Asian reckoning) when he was made crown prince in the 3rd year of the Tai'shi era (267 CE). Thus by calculation, his birth year should be 259.)), personal name Sima Zhong (司馬衷), courtesy name Zhengdu (正度), was the second emperor of the Western Jin dynasty. Emperor Hui was a developmentally disabled ruler, and throughout his reign, there was constant internecine fighting between regents, imperial princes (his great-uncle, half-brothers and distant cousins), and his wife Empress Jia Nanfeng for the right to control him (and therefore the imperial administration), causing great suffering for the people and greatly undermining the stability of the Western Jin dynasty, eventually leading to rebellions of the Five Barbarians that led to Jin's loss of northern and central China and the establishment of the competing Sixteen Kingdoms. He was briefly deposed by his granduncle Sima Lun, who usurped the throne himself, in February 301, but later that year was restored to the throne and continued to be the emperor until January 307, when he was poisoned, likely by his last regent Sima Yue.

== Life prior to ascension ==
Sima Zhong was born to Sima Yan and his wife Yang Yan in 259 AD, while Sima Yan was still the assistant to his father, the Cao Wei regent Sima Zhao. He was their second son, but after the early death of his older brother Sima Gui (司馬軌), he became the oldest surviving son. It is not known when his developmental disabilities became apparent. In any case, after Sima Zhao died in September 265, and Sima Yan subsequently forced the Cao Wei emperor Cao Huan to abdicate to him in February 266, (Note: which ended Cao Wei's reign and started the Jin dynasty (as its Emperor Wu)) he made the nine-year-old (by East Asian reckoning) Prince Zhong crown prince in 267 AD.

As Crown Prince Zhong grew in age, his developmental disabilities became clear to his parents and the imperial officials alike. (Note: A New Account of the Tales of the World recorded that Emperor Wu held He Qiao, grandson of He Qia, in high regard; he once asked He to check on Sima Zhong. After returning, He replied that Crown Prince Zhong was "just like how he was at the beginning". Gan Bao's Jin Ji recorded that Xun Yi was with He; before He gave his assessment, Xun had claimed that the crown prince had made great progress. Sun Sheng recorded in Jin Yang Qiu that the Xun clansman who went with He was Xun Xu. Liu Xiaobiao, who annotated the Shishuo Xinyu, agreed with Sun Sheng's record. However, Pei Songzhi disagreed with Liu's assessment; Pei argued that the Xun clansman involved was Xun Kai (荀恺) instead. He Qiao's biography in the Tang-era Book of Jin recorded that both Xun Xu and Xun Yi praised Sima Zhong.) He learned how to write and speak, but appeared to be unable to make logical decisions on his own at all. Once, when he heard frogs croaking, he asked, in all seriousness, "Do they croak because they want to, or because the government ordered them to?" Several times, officials reminded Emperor Wu of this, but Emperor Wu, not realizing the extent of Crown Prince Zhong's disability, resisted the implicit calls for him to be replaced. Indeed, because Emperor Wu was concerned that many officials were impressed with his talented younger brother, Sima You the Prince of Qi and might want Prince You to replace him instead, he eventually had Prince You sent to his principality, and Prince You died in anger in April 283.

On 2 April 272, (Note: According to Jia Nanfeng's biography in Book of Jin and vol.79 of Zizhi Tongjian, she was made Crown Prince Consort on the xinmao day of the 2nd month of the 8th year of the Taishi era of Sima Yan's reign. This corresponds to 2 Apr 272 in the Julian calendar. However, according to the epitaph of Jia Nanfeng's wet nurse Xu Yi, Jia was made crown prince consort in the 1st month of the 6th year of the Tai'shi era. The month corresponds to 8 Feb to 8 Mar 270 in the Julian calendar. In his Zizhi Tongjian Kaoyi, Sima Guang indicated that both Sanshi Guo Chun Qiu and Jin Chun Qiu recorded that Sima Zhong was wedded in the 2nd month of the 8th year of the Tai'shi era.) at age 13, Crown Prince Zhong married Jia Chong's daughter Jia Nanfeng, who at 14 was two years older. Possibly biased histories describe Crown Princess Jia as violent and jealous, but she had her methods of controlling Crown Prince Zhong so that he both loved and feared her. They had four daughters during their marriage, but his only son, Sima Yu, was born to Consort Xie Jiu. Consort Xie was originally a concubine of Emperor Wu, but had been given to Crown Prince Zhong prior to his marriage to Crown Princess Jia, so that Consort Xie could teach him how to have sexual relations. Sima Yu was much favored by his grandfather Emperor Wu. Emperor Wu considered Prince Yu intelligent and very much like his own grandfather Sima Yi, and this played into his decision not to replace Crown Prince Zhong. However, other than Crown Princess Jia and Lady Xie, no other consort would bear Crown Prince Zhong a child, as Crown Princess Jia ordered each pregnant concubine murdered in fits of jealousy. (Note: Emperor Wu, in anger, considered deposing Crown Princess Jia, but with the intercession of his second wife Empress Yang Zhi, he recalled Jia Chong's contributions to the establishment of the Jin dynasty, and decided to leave her in place.)

In 289, as Emperor Wu neared death, he considered whom to make the regent for Crown Prince Zhong. He considered both Empress Yang's father Yang Jun and his uncle Sima Liang the Prince of Ru'nan, the most respected of the imperial princes. As a result, Yang Jun became fearful of Sima Liang and had him posted to the key city of Xuchang (許昌, in modern Xuchang, Henan). By 290, Emperor Wu resolved to let Yang and Sima Liang both be regents, but after he wrote his will, the will was seized by Yang Jun, who instead had another will promulgated in which Yang alone was named regent. Emperor Wu died soon thereafter in May, and Crown Prince Zhong ascended the throne as Emperor Hui. Crown Princess Jia became empress, and Prince Yu became crown prince.

== Reign ==
During his 16-year reign, Emperor Hui would come under the control of a number of regents and de facto princes, never being able to assert authority on his own. The rough succession order of the regents and de facto princes were:

- Yang Jun: May 290 – 23 April 291
- Sima Liang/Wei Guan: 4 May (Note: Sima Liang was at Xuchang and not the capital Luoyang when Yang Jun died.) to July 291
- Empress Jia Nanfeng: July 291 – May 300
- Sima Lun: May 300 – May 301 (Note: This period includes the few months where Sima Lun usurped the throne.)
- Sima Jiong: June 301 – January 303
- Sima Ai: January 303 – March 304
- Sima Ying: April 304 - February 305 (Note: Sima Ying lost his position as crown prince on 4 February 305 in the Julian calendar.)
- Sima Yong: February 305 – June 306 (Note: Emperor Hui came under the control of Sima Yue when he reached Luoyang on 28 June 306 in the Julian calendar.)
- Sima Yue: June 306 – January 307

=== Regency of Yang Jun ===
Yang Jun quickly showed himself to be autocratic and incompetent, drawing the ire of many other nobles and officials. He tried to appease them by making many bestowments of titles and honors among them, but this only brought further contempt for his actions. He knew Emperor Hui's empress Jia Nanfeng to be strong-willed and treacherous, so he tried to put people loyal to him in charge of all the defense forces of the capital Luoyang, and also ordered that all edicts not only be signed by the emperor but also by Empress Dowager Yang before they could be promulgated.

Empress Jia, however, wanted to be involved in the government, and was angry that she was constantly rebuffed by Empress Dowager Yang and Yang Jun. She therefore conspired with the eunuch Dong Meng (董猛) and the generals Meng Guan (孟觀) and Li Zhao (李肇) against the Yangs. She tried to include Sima Liang in the conspiracy, but Sima Liang declined; instead, she persuaded Emperor Hui's brother, Sima Wei the Prince of Chu, to join her plan. In April 291, after Sima Wei returned to Luoyang from his defense post (Note: Jing Province (荊州, modern Hubei and Hunan)) with his troops, a coup went into progress.

Empress Jia, who had her husband easily under her control, had him issue an edict declaring that Yang Jun had committed crimes and should be removed from his posts. It also ordered Sima Wei and Sima Yao (司馬繇) the Duke of Dong'an to attack Yang's forces and defend against counterattacks. Quickly, it became clear that Yang was in trouble. Empress Dowager Yang, trapped in the palace herself, wrote an edict ordering assistance for Yang Jun and put it on arrows, shooting it out of the palace. Empress Jia then made the bold declaration that Empress Dowager Yang was committing treason. Yang Jun was quickly defeated, and his clan was massacred. Empress Dowager Yang was deposed and imprisoned. (Note: She would die in 292 under imprisonment.) Sima Liang was recalled to serve as regent, along with the senior official Wei Guan.

=== Regency of Sima Liang and Wei Guan ===
To appease those who might have been angry and had overthrown Yang Jun, Sima Liang also widely promoted those who participated in the plot, and more than a thousand men were created marquesses. He and Wei, however, did try to get the government on track, but Empress Jia continued to interfere with governmental matters. They also became concerned about the violent temper of Sima Wei and therefore tried to strip him of his military command, but Sima Wei persuaded Empress Jia to let him keep his military command. Sima Wei's assistants Qi Sheng (岐盛) and Gongsun Hong (公孫宏) thereafter falsely told Empress Jia that Sima Liang and Wei planned to depose the emperor. Empress Jia, who had already resented Wei for having suggested that the heir selection be changed during Emperor Wu's reign, desired more direct control over the government, and therefore resolved to initiate a second coup d'état.

In summer 291, Empress Jia had Emperor Hui personally write an edict to Sima Wei, ordering him to have Sima Liang and Wei removed from their offices. His forces thereby surrounded Sima Liang and Wei's mansions, and while both men's subordinates recommended resistance, they each declined and were easily captured. Contrary to the edict's terms, both were killed—Sima Liang with his heir Sima Ju (司馬矩) and Wei with nine of his sons and grandsons. Qi then suggested to Sima Wei to take the opportunity to massacre Empress Jia's relatives and take over the government himself, but Sima Wei hesitated— at the same time, Empress Jia came to the realization that if the murders of Sima Liang and Wei could be traced to her instigation, that would bring a political firestorm' also that Sima Wei could not be easily controlled. She therefore publicly declared that Sima Wei had falsely issued the edict. Sima Wei's troops abandoned him, and he was captured and executed. Sima Liang and Wei were posthumously honored. From this point on, Empress Jia became the undisputed power behind the throne for several years.

=== Empress Jia behind the throne ===
Empress Jia now issued imperial edicts for whatever she wanted through her husband Emperor Hui and in his name, she received and responded to the memorials and petitions of the officials; she also to control the government in close association with several advisors that she trusted—the capable official Zhang Hua, her cousins Pei Wei and Jia Mo (賈模), and her nephew Jia Mi (originally named Han Mi but posthumously adopted into the line of Jia Chong's son Jia Limin (賈黎民)). She also closely associated with her distant cousin-once-removed Guo Zhang (郭彰), her sister Jia Wu (賈午), and Emperor Wu's concubine Zhao Can (趙粲). She lacked self-control, and was violent and capricious in her ways, but Zhang, Pei, and Jia Mo were honest men who generally kept the government in order. However, as she grew increasingly unbridled in her behavior (including committing adultery with many men and later murdering them to silence them), Zhang, Pei, and Jia Mo considered deposing her and replacing her with Crown Prince Yu's mother Consort Xie, but they hesitated and never took actual action. After Jia Mo died in 299, it became even harder to control her actions.

In 296, the Di and Qiang of Qin (秦州, modern eastern Gansu) and Yong (雍州, modern central and northern Shaanxi) started a major rebellion against Jin dynasty, and they supported the Di chieftain Qi Wannian to be emperor. In 297, the Jin general Zhou Chu (周處), without support from the central government, was easily defeated by Qi. A large group of refugees, most of Di ancestry, stricken by the famine that resulted from the warfare, fled south into Yi Province (modern Sichuan and Chongqing), led by Li Te. (Several years later, they would eventually be forced into rebellion and peel away from Jin rule.) In February or March 299, Meng Guan was able to defeat Qi, but Qi foreshadowed much more serious non-Han rebellions of the future. Soon after the rebellion was put down, the mid-level official Jiang Tong (江統) would petition Empress Jia to have the non-Han tribes removed from the empire proper and relocated to regions outside the empire, but Empress Jia did not accept his suggestions.

The relationship between Empress Jia and Crown Prince Yu had always been an uneasy one. Empress Jia's mother Guo Huai had constantly advised Empress Jia to treat Crown Prince Yu well, as her own son, and she advocated marrying Jia Mi's sister to Crown Prince Yu. However, Empress Jia and Jia Wu opposed this, and instead married a daughter of the official Wang Yan to Crown Prince Yu. (Wang had two daughters, but Empress Jia had Crown Prince Yu marry the less beautiful one and had Jia Mi marry the more beautiful one.) After Lady Guo's death, the relationship between Empress Jia and Crown Prince Yu quickly deteriorated, as Jia Wu and Consort Zhao provoked difficulties between them. Further, Crown Prince Yu and Jia Mi never liked each other, and Jia Mi, as a result, also advised Empress Jia to depose Crown Prince Yu. In early 300, Empress Jia agreed and took action. When Crown Prince Yu was in the palace to make an official petition to have his ill son Sima Bin (司馬彬) created a prince, Empress Jia forced him to drink a large amount of wine and, once he was drunk, had him write out a statement in which he declared intention to murder the emperor and the empress and to take over as emperor. Empress Jia presented the writing to the officials and initially wanted Crown Prince Yu executed—but after some resistance, she only had him deposed and reduced to the status of a commoner in February. Crown Prince Yu's mother Consort Xie was executed, as was his favorite concubine Consort Jiang Jun (蔣俊).

In April 300, under the advice of a prince she favored—Sima Lun the Prince of Zhao, Emperor Wu's uncle—Empress Jia decided to eliminate Crown Prince Yu as a threat. She sent assassins and had Crown Prince Yu assassinated. Sima Lun, however, had other plans—he wanted to have Empress Jia murder the crown prince so that he could use the murder as an excuse to overthrow her, and he started a coup later that year, killing Jia Mi, Zhang, Pei, and other associates of Empress Jia. Empress Jia was deposed and later forced to commit suicide. Sima Lun and his strategist Sun Xiu became the paramount authority.

=== Regency of and usurpation by Sima Lun ===
Sima Lun restored the late Crown Prince Yu's reputation and had his son, Sima Zang (司馬臧), created crown prince. However, Sima Lun himself had designs on the throne, and he and Sun Xiu became partial to placing those who favored them in power. Emperor Hui's half-brother, Sima Yun (司馬允) the Prince of Huai'nan, correctly determined what Sima Lun's ambitions were, and as a result, Sima Lun and Sun tried to strip Sima Yun's military command. When Sima Yun read the edict ordering him to turn over the troops, he saw that it was Sun Xiu's handwriting—and became enraged and started a rebellion with his troops. Initially, he had successes against Sima Lun's troops and was almost able to capture Sima Lun's mansion, during the course of one day. Late in the day, Chen Zhun (陳準), who secretly supported Sima Yun, persuaded Emperor Hui to give him a banner that showed imperial support and was able to deliver it to Sima Yun, but his messenger, a friend of Sima Lun's son Sima Qian (司馬虔), instead tricked Sima Yun into receiving the banner and, as he did, cut off his head. His troops disbanded after his death.

After defeating Sima Yun, Sima Lun became ever more intent on usurping the throne. Late in 300, after Sun Xiu's suggestion, Sima Lun was granted the nine bestowments. However, Sima Lun and his sons were themselves foolish and unintelligent, and Sun was the actual person in charge of the government. In December, Sun had the granddaughter of his distant relative and friend Sun Qi (孫旂), Yang Xianrong, married to Emperor Hui to be his empress.

Also in winter 300, the governor of Yi Province, Zhao Xin, a relative of Empress Jia, rebelled and tried to occupy Yi Province to be his own domain. He associated with Li Te and his brother Li Xiang, and they soon were able to take over Yi Province. However, he then became suspicious of the Li brothers' abilities, and he killed Li Xiang after Li Xiang suggested that he declare himself emperor. Li Te, in anger, took his troops and killed Zhao. Li then welcomed the new Jin governor Luo Shang to the provincial capital Chengdu (成都, in modern Chengdu, Sichuan), but maintained an uneasy relationship with Luo and Luo's main strategist, Xin Ran (辛冉), a former friend of his who deeply suspected his intentions.

In spring 301, Sima Lun had Emperor Hui yield the throne to him, and gave Emperor Hui the honorific title of retired emperor (太上皇). In order to appease those who might be angry at his usurpation, he rewarded many people with honors. Sun, in particular, was issuing edicts based on his own whims. Suspecting three key princes – Sima Jiong the Prince of Qi (Emperor Hui's cousin and the son of Emperor Hui's uncle Sima You, Prince Xian of Qi), Sima Ying the Prince of Chengdu (Emperor Hui's half-brother), and Sima Yong the Prince of Hejian (the grandson of Emperor Hui's great-granduncle Sima Fu the Prince of Anping), each of whom had strong independent military commands—Sun sent his trusted subordinates to be their assistants. Prince Jiong refused and declared a rebellion to restore Emperor Hui. Prince Ying, Sima Ai the Prince of Changsha (Emperor Hui's half-brother), and Sima Xin the Duke of Xinye (the son of Sima Jun, a granduncle of Emperor Hui) all declared support for Prince Jiong. Prince Yong initially sent his general Zhang Fang with intent to support Sima Lun, but then heard that Princes Jiong and Ying had great forces, and so declared for the rebels instead. Sima Lun's forces were easily defeated by Princes Jiong and Ying's forces, and after just declaring himself emperor for three months, Sima Lun was captured by officials in Luoyang who declared for the rebellion as well, and forced to issue an edict returning the throne to Emperor Hui. He was then forced to commit suicide. Sun and other associates of Sima Lun were executed.

Some thought that a power balance that Emperor Wu had hoped for at his death might be restored, as Princes Jiong and Ying were each given regent titles (and awarded the nine bestowments, in one rare case where the nine bestowments were not signs of an impending usurpation, although Prince Ying declined the bestowments), and many talented officials were promoted into important positions. However, the Princes Jiong and Ying were actually apprehensive of each other's power, and Prince Ying decided to yield the central government regency to Prince Jiong at the time and return to his defense post at Yecheng.

=== Regency of Sima Jiong ===
Meanwhile, Luo Shang ordered that the Qin/Yong refugees go home and that they surrender all property that they pillaged during the wars of Zhao's rebellion. This caused great burden and fear on the refugees, and Li Te requested a one-year extension; Luo agreed, but Xin Ran and other officials under Luo were unhappy and secretly planned an attack on Li. Li, anticipating that this might happen, was prepared, and he defeated Xin's forces easily.

In the capital, Sima Jiong became arrogant based on his accomplishments. He had his sons created princes, and ran the matters of the central government from his mansion, rarely visiting the emperor or attending the imperial meetings. He enlarged his mansion to be as large as the palace, and he entrusted matters to people who were close to him, and would not change his ways even when some of his more honest associates tried to change his behavior. When Emperor Hui's grandsons Sima Zang and Sima Shang (司馬尚), successive crown princes, died in childhood, leaving Emperor Hui without male descendants by 302, Sima Ying was considered the appropriate successor, but Sima Jiong chose to bypass him by recommending the seven-year-old Sima Tan the Prince of Qinghe (Emperor Hui's nephew and the son of his brother Sima Xia (司馬遐)) as the crown prince, with intent to easily control the young Crown Prince Qin.

Sima Jiong became suspicious of Sima Yong the Prince of Hejian—because Sima Yong had initially wanted to support Sima Lun, until he saw that Sima Lun's cause was hopeless. Sima Yong knew of Sima Jiong's suspicion, and started a conspiracy; he invited Sima Ai the Prince of Changsha to overthrow Sima Jiong, believing that Sima Ai would fail; his plan was then to, in conjunction with Sima Ying, start a war against Sima Jiong. Once they were victorious, he would depose Emperor Hui and make Sima Ying the emperor, and then serve as Sima Ying's prime minister. In winter 302, Sima Yong declared his rebellion, and Sima Ying soon joined, despite opposition from his strategist Lu Zhi. Hearing that Sima Ai was part of the conspiracy as well, Sima Jiong made a preemptive strike against Sima Ai, but Sima Ai was prepared and entered the palace to control Emperor Hui. After a street battle, Sima Jiong's forces collapsed, and he was executed. Sima Ai effectively controlled Emperor Hui and the imperial court in Luoyang, but in order to reduce opposition, he submitted all important matters to Sima Ying, still stationed at Yecheng.

=== Under Sima Ai ===
Sima Ai, of the princes, appeared to be the only one who saw the importance of formally honoring Emperor Hui while maintaining resemblance to impartial governance. He continued to try to share power with Sima Ying.

Meanwhile, in Yi Province, in 303, Luo Shang, after causing Li Te to be ready by offering a truce, made a surprise attack against Li's forces and killed him. Li's forces fell under the command of his brother Li Liu, who died later that year as well and was succeeded by his nephew Li Xiong. Under Li Xiong's command, the refugee forces were able to defeat not only Luo's forces but also reinforcements sent by Jing Province (荊州, modern Hubei and Hunan). At the same time of Li's successes, many agrarian rebellions also started throughout the empire, including one that defeated the forces of the powerful Sima Xin the Prince of Xinye and killed him.

In fall 303, Sima Yong, dissatisfied that his plan did not come to fruition, persuaded Sima Ying to again join him against Sima Ai. While Sima Yong and Sima Ying had overwhelming force, their forces could not score a conclusive victory against Sima Ai. Sima Yong's forces were about to withdraw in spring 304 when Sima Yue the Prince of Donghai, the grandson of a great-granduncle of Emperor Hui, believing that Sima Ai could not win this war, arrested him and delivered him to Sima Yong's general Zhang Fang, who executed Sima Ai cruelly by burning him to death. Sima Ying became in effective control of the government, but continued to control it remotely from Yecheng.

=== Under Sima Ying ===
Once Sima Ying became in effective control of the government, he deposed Crown Prince Qin and made himself crown prince instead, and he also deposed Empress Yang—the first of four times she would be deposed during a duration of two years. He became arrogant and extravagant, and the people became disappointed. Seeing this, Sima Yue decided to resist; he welcomed Empress Yang and Crown Prince Qin back to their positions, and, in Emperor Hui's name, set out to attack Sima Ying. His forces were defeated by Sima Ying's, and he fled, leaving Emperor Hui in Sima Ying's hands at Yecheng. Sima Yong's forces entered Luoyang and deposed Empress Yang and Crown Prince Qin again.

Wang Jun, the military commander of You Province (幽州, modern Beijing, Tianjin, and northern Hebei), who had an uneasy relationship with Sima Ying up to this point, then declared war against Sima Ying and headed south with his troops, allied with various Xianbei and Wuhuan tribes. Sima Ying found it difficult to resist them, and he sent one of his subordinates, the Xiongnu noble Liu Yuan, to his own tribesmen to ask them to join him. Once Liu left, however, Sima Ying's forces collapsed. When Liu heard this, instead of bringing his forces to Sima Ying's aid, he declared independence and entitled himself the Prince of Han—claiming rightful inheritance of the Han dynasty, as he claimed to be descended from a Han princess who had married a Xiongnu chanyu – and thus establishing Han-Zhao. (Note: A month earlier, Li Xiong had declared himself independent of Jin as well, as the Prince of Chengdu, establishing Cheng-Han; these two states would be the first two of the Sixteen Kingdoms.)

Sima Ying fled back to Luoyang with Emperor Hui, but now with no forces backing him. Sima Yong, in control of the situation, decided to directly take control without using Sima Ying any longer, and Sima Ying was removed from the crown prince position and replaced with another brother of Emperor Hui's – Sima Chi the Prince of Yuzhang, who was considered studious and humble. Sima Yong also had Zhang Fang forcibly move Emperor Hui to Chang'an, (Note: in modern Xi'an, Shaanxi) directly under his own grasp. However, a number of high-level officials remained in Luoyang and formed a separate government that was partially allied with and partially rivalling Sima Yong's.

=== Under Sima Yong ===
Sima Yong tried to appease possible opposing forces by promoting all of the major princes and warlords, but his promotions did not have the desired effect. Meanwhile, Han-Zhao attracted those Han and non-Han agrarians and tribesmen disappointed in Jin rule, and began to grow in size and power.

At the same time, however, the Jin infighting continued. In the fall of 305, Sima Yue declared yet another rebellion, this time against Sima Yong, claiming that Sima Yong had improperly forced Emperor Hui to move the capital. Various provincial governors and military commanders were forced to be on one side or the other. The war was initially inconclusive. In early 306, after a few victories by Sima Yue, Sima Yong became fearful, and he executed Zhang to seek peace; Sima Yue refused. By summer 306, Sima Yong was forced to abandon both Chang'an and Emperor Hui, and Sima Yue's forces welcomed Emperor Hui back to Luoyang and restored Empress Yang on 28 June.

Also in 306, both Li Xiong and Liu Yuan declared themselves emperors, even more clearly breaking from Jin.

=== Under Sima Yue and death ===
With Sima Yue effectively controlling the government, Emperor Hui reigned for several months until 8 January 307, when, for unknown reasons, he was poisoned while eating bread. (Note: Historians commonly accept Sima Yue as the culprit, but the motive is not clear. One possible reason could be that Sima Yue regarded Emperor Hui as a jinx, for all his regents (besides Sima Yong) died unnatural deaths. After Emperor Hui's death, Sima Yong was also tricked into surrendering himself and killed by a general under Sima Mo, Yue's younger brother.) Thus ended the reign of an emperor who suffered much and under whose reign the Jin dynastic system came crashing down, even though he himself should probably not be blamed for it. Crown Prince Chi succeeded him (as Emperor Huai) and would try to restrengthen the empire, but it was too late for Jin by that point. It would end up losing northern and central China to Han-Zhao and be forced to relocate to southern China, continued in a branch line of the imperial clan.

== Anecdotes ==
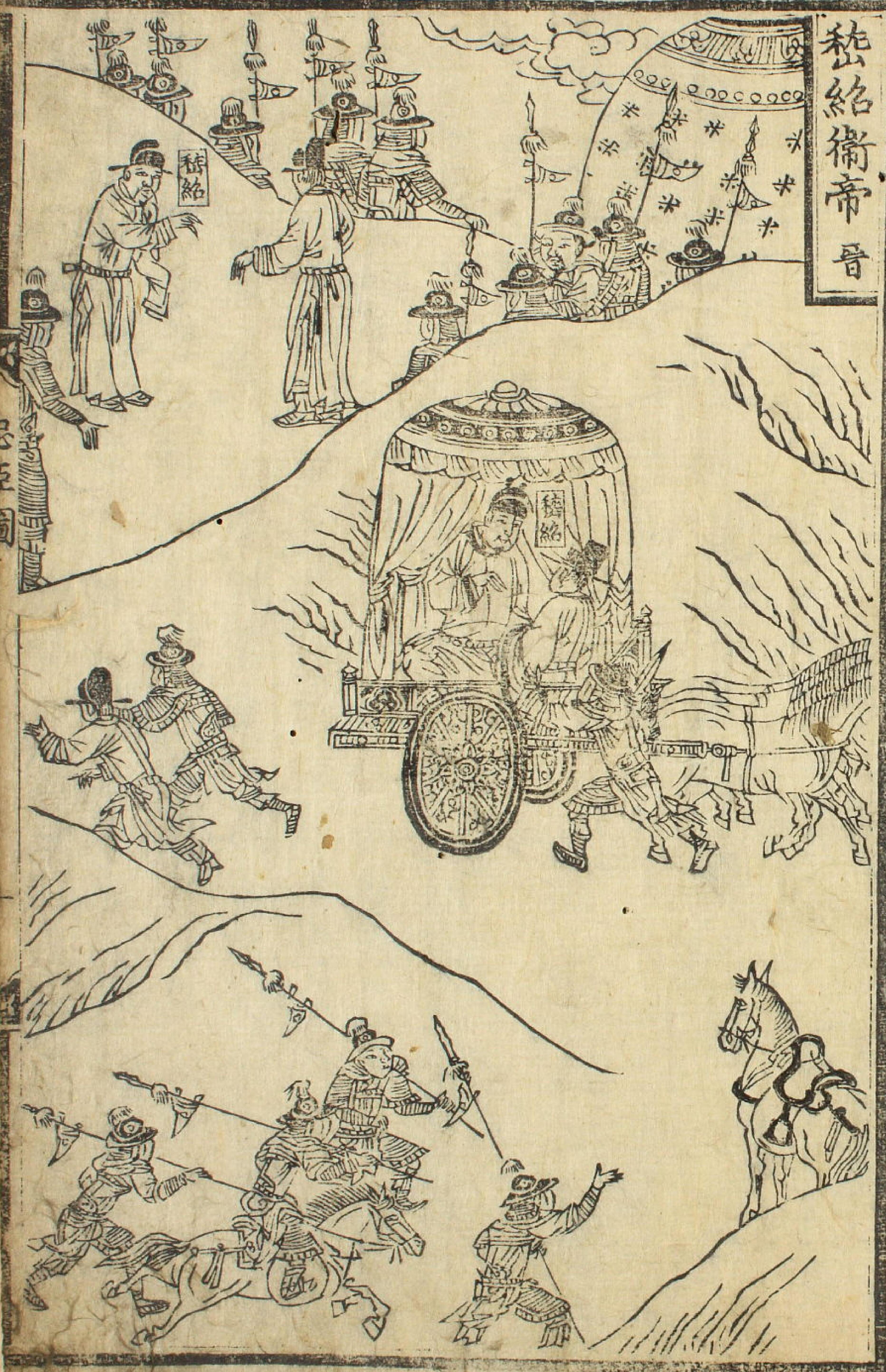
"Ji Shao Protects the Emperor" (嵆紹衛帝) from the Samgang Haengsil-to (삼강행실도) by Korean scholar, Seol Sun during the Joseon period.

=== "Why don't they eat porridge with ground meat?" ===
The Book of Jin, a 7th-century chronicle of the Chinese Jin dynasty, reports that when Emperor Hui was told that his people were starving because there was no rice, he said, "Why don't they eat porridge with meat?" (何不食肉糜), showing his unfitness. It has since then become a famous phrase in both classical and modern Chinese. It is analogous to the phrase "Let them eat cake" in French culture.

=== "Attendant Ji's blood" ===
Despite his shortcomings, Emperor Hui was also depicted in a sympathetic light. Ji Shao, son of Ji Kang, was an attendant who stayed and fought by Emperor's Hui's side after Sima Yue's forces were defeated by Sima Ying at the Battle of Dangyin in 304. Ji Shao protected Emperor Hui with his body from the rain of arrows and was eventually killed, with his blood splattering on the emperor's clothes. Emperor Hui fainted, and when he woke up in Ye, he forbid his servants from washing the clothes, exclaiming, "This is the blood of Attendant Ji (Shao). Do not wash it off!"

== Heirs ==
- October 290 – February 300: Sima Yu, Crown Prince Minhuai (湣懷太子司馬遹; son of Emperor Hui)
- June 300 – February 301: Sima Zang, Crown Prince Minchong (湣衝太孫司馬臧; son of Crown Prince Minhuai)
- c.July 301 – May 302: Sima Shang, Crown Prince Huaichong (懷衝太孫司馬尚; son of Crown Prince Minhuai)
- July 302 – April 304: Sima Tan (司馬覃; nephew of Emperor Hui)
- May 304 – February 305: Sima Ying, Prince of Chengdu (成都王司馬穎; half-brother of Emperor Hui)
- February 305 – January 307: Sima Chi, Prince of Yuzhang (豫章王司馬熾; half-brother of Emperor Hui)

== Era names ==
- Yongxi (永熙; yǒng xī) May 17, 290 – February 15, 291
- Yongping (永平; yǒng píng) February 16 – April 23, 291
- Yuankang (元康; yuán kāng) April 24, 291 – February 6, 300
- Yongkang (永康; yǒng kāng) February 7, 300 – February 3, 301
- Yongning (永寧; yǒng níng) June 1, 301 – January 4, 303
- Tai'an (太安; tài ān) January 5, 303 – February 21, 304
- Yongan (永安; yǒng ān) February 22 – August 15, 304; December 14, 304 – February 11, 305
- Jianwu (建武; jiàn wǔ) August 16 – December 13, 304
- Yongxing (永興; yǒng xīng) February 12, 305 – July 12, 306
- Guangxi (光熙; guāng xī) July 13, 306 – February 19, 307

== Family ==
- Empress Huijia, of the Jia clan (惠贾皇后 賈氏; 257–300), personal name Nanfeng (南風)
  - Princess Hedong (河東公主)
    - Married Sun Hui (孫會; d. 301; son of Sun Xiu) in c.October 300
  - Princess Hongnong (弘农公主), personal name Xuanhua (宣華)
    - Married Fu Xuan (傅宣, son of Fu Zhi (傅祗))
  - Princess Shiping (始平公主)
  - Lady Aixian (哀献皇女), personal name Nüyan (女彥) (Note: Details on Sima Nüyan are found in Yiwen Leiju.)
- Empress Xianwen, of the Yang clan of Taishan (獻文皇后 泰山羊氏; d. 322), personal name Xianrong (獻容)
  - Princess Linhai (臨海公主) (Note: Princess Linhai's mother being Yang Xianrong is per vol. 16 of Yiwen Leiju and vol.152 of Taiping Yulan, citing Jin Zhong Xing Shu (晋中兴书). Jin Zhong Xing Shu also recorded that Princess Linhai's initial title was Princess Qinghe. The Tang-era Jin Shu recorded that her mother was Jia Nanfeng instead; the record on Princess Linhai is broadly similar to the record in Jin Zhong Xing Shu, with the main difference being that the person who rescued her from slavery was Emperor Yuan of Jin, rather than Zhou Zha (周札), son of Zhou Chu.)
    - Married Cao Tong (曹統)
- Shuyuan, of the Xie clan (淑媛 謝氏; d. 300), personal name Jiu (玖)
  - Sima Yu, Crown Prince Minhuai (愍懷皇太子 司馬遹; 278–300), only son

== Notes ==
Emperor Hui of Jin House of Sima Born: 259 Died: 8 January 307
Regnal titles
Preceded by Emperor Wu of Jin	Emperor of China; Western Jin; 290 – February 301 with Yang Jun (290–291); Sima Liang (291); Wei Guan (291); Empress Jia Nanfeng (291–300); Sima Lun (300–301)	Succeeded by Sima Lun
Preceded by Sima Lun	Emperor of China; Western Jin; June 301 – 304 with Sima Jiong (301–302); Sima Ai (302–304); Sima Ying (304)	Succeeded by Himself
Preceded by Sima Lun	Emperor of China; Western Jin; June 301 – 304 with Sima Jiong (301–302); Sima Ai (302–304); Sima Ying (304)	Succeeded by Liu Yuan as Emperor of Han Zhao
Preceded by Sima Lun	Emperor of China; Western Jin; June 301 – 304 with Sima Jiong (301–302); Sima Ai (302–304); Sima Ying (304)	Succeeded by Li Xiong as Emperor of Cheng Han
Preceded by Himself	Emperor of China; Western Jin; 304–307 with Sima Yong (304–306); Sima Yue (306–307)	Succeeded by Emperor Huai of Jin
Honorary titles
Vacant Title last held by Liu Taigong	Retired Emperor of China; Western Jin; February 301 – June 301	Vacant Title next held by Lü Guang
