= He Qia =

3rd century Cao Wei state official

- 和洽

Minister of Ceremonies (太常)
- In office ?–?
- Monarch: Cao Rui

Minister of the Household (光祿勳)
- In office 220 – 226
- Monarch: Cao Pi

Prefect of the Gentlemen of the Palace (郎中令)
- In office 219 – 220
- Monarch: Emperor Xian of Han
- Chancellor: Cao Cao

Personal details
- Born: Unknown Xiping County, Henan
- Died: Between 228 and 233
- Children: He Li; He You
- Occupation: Politician
- Courtesy name: Yangshi (陽士)
- Posthumous name: Marquis Jian (簡侯)
- Peerage: Marquis of Xiling District (西陵鄉侯)

He Qia (died between 228 and 233), courtesy name Yangshi, was a Chinese official of the state of Cao Wei during the Three Kingdoms period of China. He was known for his austere lifestyle.

== Early life ==
He Qia was born in Xiping County (西平縣), Runan Commandery (汝南郡), Yu Province, which is present-day Xiping County, Henan. In the 190s, the warlord Yuan Shao sent ambassadors to Runan Commandery inviting the gentry and nobility to join his cause. Yu Province was an area of contention between Yuan Shao and his half-brother Yuan Shu, so He Qia feared staying, but he did not want to serve under a man such as Yuan Shao, whose ambition He Qia felt exceeded his capability.

Instead, He Qia brought his family south to Jing Province to serve the provincial governor Liu Biao, whom He Qia considered to be a kind lord without higher ambition. Crossing the Yangtze river, he settled in at Wuling Commandery (武陵郡) in present-day Changde, Hunan.

== Service under Cao Cao ==
In the late 190s, Cao Cao gained control over parts of Jing Province, and He Qia found employment in his administration. In this early stage of his career, he spoke out against the elevation of officers based on their following an ascetic, deliberately impoverished lifestyle, and against seeing these men as more pure than officers who displayed their salary outwardly.

In 213, after Emperor Xian enfeoffed Cao Cao as the Duke of Wei (魏公), He Qia served as a Palace Attendant in Cao Cao's court. He unsuccessfully defended Mao Jie against rumours that Mao slandered Cao Cao. Correspondence on the matter between He Qia and Cao Cao has survived and has been preserved in the Records of the Three Kingdoms. Due to the rumours, Mao Jie was forced to commit suicide in 216.

== Later career ==
He Qia received successive promotions under Cao Cao and Cao Pi, rising to the position of Minister of the Household (光祿勳), the most important personnel manager of the Wei court. Under Cao Rui, he was granted 200 taxable households in his marquisate as the Marquis of Xiling District (西陵鄉侯).

Late in life, He Qia reversed his position on asceticism and began living a greatly curtailed lifestyle. After he was promoted to the prestigious position of Minister of Ceremonies (太常) under Cao Rui, he gave so freely of his salary that he was forced to liquidate his real estate in order to support himself. Cao Rui granted him grain and silk so He Qia could avoid total insolvency. His modest lifestyle is reflected in his posthumous name, Marquis Jian (簡侯; "modest marquis").

== Family ==
- He Li (和离), He Qia's elder son and successor
- He You (和逌), He Qia's younger son, served as Minister of Justice (廷尉) and Secretary of Personnel (吏部尚書) in Wei
  - He Qiao (和嶠; died 292), He You's son, served as Junior Protector of the Crown Prince (太子少保) for Sima Yu of the Western Jin dynasty; nephew of Xiahou Xuan
  - He Yu (和郁; died between July and September 311), (Note: Within the Book of Jin, there are discrepancies on when He Yu died. The annals of Emperor Huai recorded that he died in the Disaster of Yongjia. However, both He Yu's and Gou Xi's biographies recorded that He managed to escape to Gou's domain after the Disaster; He's biography indicated that he died soon after this escape. Gou was captured by Shi Le in c.October 311.) He You's son, served as Director of the Imperial Secretariat (尚書令) under the Western Jin dynasty
    - He Ji (和濟), He Yu's son, served as a Palace Writer Attendant (中書郎) under the Western Jin dynasty
