= Sima Wei =

Sima Wei 司馬瑋

Prince of Chu (楚王)
- Tenure: 22 December 289 – 26 July 291
- Born: 271
- Died: 291 (aged 19–20)
- Issue: Sima Fan; Sima Yi (Note: According to the Book of Jin, Sima Yi was made heir to Sima Gui, the full-brother of Emperor Hui who died at the age of two (by East Asian reckoning) and was given a posthumous name and title in 289. According to Emperor Wu's biography in the same work, Sima Yi was made Prince of Piling on the same day his father was made Prince of Chu. Emperor Hui's biography recorded that Sima Gui died on the jia'xu day of the 4th month of the 1st year of the Yuan'kang era; this record likely refers to Sima Yi's death instead. Also, there was no jia'xu day in the 5th month; the month corresponds to 14 Jun to 13 Jul 291 in the Julian calendar.)
Posthumous name
- Prince Yin of Chu (楚隱王)
- Father: Emperor Wu of Jin
- Mother: Lady Shen

Sima Wei (司馬瑋) (271 (Note: According to Sima Wei's biography in Book of Jin, he was 21 (by East Asian reckoning) when he died. Thus by calculation, his birth year should be 271.) – 26 July 291 (Note: According to Sima Zhong's biography in the Book of Jin, and vol.82 of Zizhi Tongjian, Sima Wei was killed on the yi'chou day of the 6th month of the 1st year of the Yong'ping era of Emperor Hui's reign. This corresponds to 26 Jul 291 in the Julian calendar.)), courtesy name Yandu (彥度), formally Prince Yin of Chu (楚隱王), was an imperial prince during the Western Jin dynasty and was the second of the eight princes commonly associated with the War of the Eight Princes.

The half-brother of Emperor Hui of Jin, Sima Wei aligned himself with Empress Jia to overthrow the overbearing regent, Yang Jun and his family. His granduncle, Sima Liang and the minister, Wei Guan were installed to take over the regency, but Sima Wei soon became dissatisfied by their attempts to strip him of his military power. He allied with Empress Jia once more, and, after forging an imperial edict which placed him virtually in command of the empire's military, he had the two regents arrested and killed. However, Empress Jia betrayed him by accusing him of treason, and just a day later, he too was apprehended and executed.

== Life ==
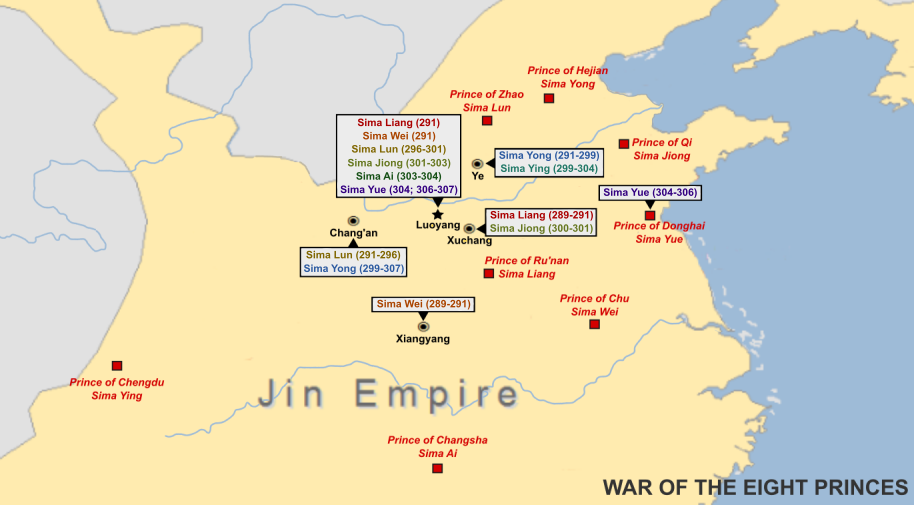
Map showing the Wars of the Eight Princes

Sima Wei was the ninth (Note: Sima Wei's biography in the Tang-era Book of Jin recorded that he was Emperor Wu's fifth son. The Jin Shu Jiaozhu (晉書斠注) by Wu Shijian (吴士鉴) and Liu Chenggan (刘承干) claimed that the Tang-era Bei Tang Shu Chao (北堂书抄), citing Wang Yin's Jin Shu, recorded that Sima Wei was Emperor Wu's ninth son. The biographies of Sima Zhao (Prince Ai of Chengyang and Emperor Wu's full younger brother) and Sima Jing in the Tang-era Book of Jin recorded that after the Prince of Chengyang's death, Emperor Wu chose his son Sima Jing (courtesy name Jingdu; also Sima Wei's full elder brother) to be the Prince of Chengyang's heir. After Sima Jing's death in 270, Emperor Wu consecutively chose his fifth son Sima Xian and sixth son Sima Zhi as the Prince of Chengyang's heir. As such, it is more likely that Sima Wei was actually Emperor Wu's ninth son.) son of Jin's founding emperor Emperor Wu, by his concubine Consort Shen; his elder full-brother Sima Jing, Prince Huai of Chengyang, had died in 270 before he was born. On 5 October 277, when he was about 6 years old, he was created the Prince of Shiping (始平王); his younger full-brother Sima Ai was also born in that year. Late in his father's reign, on 22 December 289, he was created the Prince of Chu and charged with the military commands of Jing Province (荊州, modern Hubei and Hunan). After his father died in May 290, his half-brother Crown Prince Zhong ascended the throne as Emperor Hui. Empress Dowager Yang's father Yang Jun was regent, but many people were dissatisfied with his hold on power. One of those was Emperor Hui's wife Empress Jia Nanfeng, and she entered into a conspiracy with Sima Wei, among others, to overthrow Yang Jun. In 291, Sima Wei returned to the capital Luoyang with his troops, and soon a coup happened in April.

Empress Jia, who had her husband easily under her control, had him issue an edict declaring that Yang Jun had committed crimes and should be removed from his posts. It also ordered Sima Wei and Sima Yao (司馬繇; son of Sima Zhou) the Duke of Dong'an to attack Yang's forces and defend against counterattacks. Quickly, it became clear that Yang was in trouble. Empress Dowager Yang, trapped in the palace herself, wrote an edict ordering assistance for Yang Jun and put it on arrows, shooting it out of the palace. Empress Jia then made the bold declaration that Empress Dowager Yang was committing treason. Yang Jun was quickly defeated, and his clan was massacred. Emperor Hui's granduncle Sima Liang was recalled to serve as regent in May, along with Wei Guan.

Sima Liang and Wei Guan had reservations about Sima Wei's ferocity in overthrowing Yang, and they therefore tried to strip him of his military command, but Sima Wei persuaded Empress Jia to let him keep his military command. Sima Wei's assistants Qi Sheng (岐盛) and Gongsun Hong (公孫宏) thereafter falsely told Empress Jia that Sima Liang and Wei Guan planned to depose the emperor. Empress Jia, who had already resented Wei for having, during Emperor Wu's reign, suggested that he change his heir selection, also wanted more direct control over the government, and therefore resolved to plot a second coup.

In summer 291, Empress Jia had Emperor Hui personally write an edict, ordering for Sima Liang and Wei Guan removed from their offices. When Sima Wei received the edict, he was unhappy with the content, as he was not mentioned among the princes who had to raise their army. After his request to send a petition regarding the edict was denied, Wei decided to forge an edict of his own, making himself Commander of all military affairs and taking charge of the operation. His forces thereby surrounded Sima Liang and Wei Guan's mansions, and while both men's subordinates recommended resistance, each declined and was captured. Both were killed—Sima Liang with his heir Sima Ju (司馬矩) and Wei Guan with nine of his sons and grandsons. With the military still under his control, Qi then suggested to Sima Wei to take the chance to kill Empress Jia's relatives and take over the government, but Sima Wei hesitated.

At the same time, Empress Jia came to two realizations: first, if it were realized she had ordered the killing of Sima Liang and Wei Guan it could bring a political firestorm; and second, that Sima Wei would not be easily controlled. She therefore publicly declared that Sima Wei had falsely issued the edict. Sima Wei's troops abandoned him, and he was captured and executed. At the execution, he tried to show the edict to the official in charge of the execution, Liu Song (劉頌), and Liu, knowing that Sima Wei had actually carried out the coup on Empress Jia's orders, was saddened, but still carried out the execution. Gongsun Hong and Qi Sheng were also executed, along with their clans.

Despite his volatile temper, Sima Wei was known for his generosity, and he was greatly missed by the people. On 13 October 301, (Note: Emperor Hui's biography in Book of Jin indicate that Sima Fan was made Prince of Xiangyang on the ding'chou day of the 8th month of the 1st year of the Yong'ning era. It is presumed that Sima Wei was posthumously honored at the same time.) after Empress Jia's death, he was posthumously rewarded with the office of a general, and his son Sima Fan (司馬範), while not given the principality of Chu, was created the Prince of Xiangyang. Sima Fan was later killed by Shi Le, in the aftermath of Sima Yue's death and the Battle of Ningping in 311.
