= Sima Liang =

Regent for Chinese Jin-dynasty Emperor Hui (died 291)

- 司馬亮

Regent of the Jin dynasty
- In office 4 May – 25 July 291
- Monarch: Emperor Hui

Personal details
- Born: Between 211 and 227
- Died: 26 July 291
- Parents: Sima Yi (father); Lady Fu (mother)

Prince of Ru'nan (汝南王)
- Tenure: 5 October 277 – 26 July 291

Prince of Fufeng (扶风王)
- Tenure: 9 February 266 – 5 October 277
Posthumous name
- Prince Wencheng of Ru'nan (汝南文成王)
- House: Jin dynasty

Sima Liang (司馬亮) (before 227 (Note: While Sima Liang's birth year is not recorded, it is recorded in volume 38 of Book of Jin that he was older than his full-brother Sima Zhou, who was born in 227. At the same time, he was younger than his half-brother Sima Zhao, who was born in 211.) - 25 July 291 (Note: According to Sima Zhong's biography in the Book of Jin, Sima Wei was killed on the yichou day in the 6th month of the 1st year of the Yongping era of Emperor Hui's reign. This corresponds to 26 Jul 291 in the Gregorian calendar. In Sima Wei's biography, it was recorded that he was killed the day after Sima Liang died. Vol.82 of Zizhi Tongjian did not explicitly record when Sima Liang and Wei Guan were killed, but it did record that they were killed in the 6th month of that year, before the yichou day when Sima Wei was executed. The month starts from 14 July 291 in the Julian calendar.)), courtesy name Ziyi (子翼), formally Prince Wencheng of Ru'nan (汝南文成王), was briefly a regent during the reign of Emperor Hui during the Western Jin dynasty. He was the first of the eight princes commonly associated with the War of the Eight Princes.

A son of Sima Yi, he was entrusted by his nephew, Emperor Wu of Jin to act as regent for the developmentally disabled Emperor Hui. Though he was initially excluded from the regency due to interference from his co-regent Yang Jun, he was later installed alongside the minister, Wei Guan in May 291 after Empress Jia Nanfeng led a coup against Yang Jun in April that year. His short regency in Luoyang was marked by his dispute with the Prince of Chu, Sima Wei. In July 291, Sima Wei allied himself with Empress Jia and falsely charged Sima Liang and Wei Guan of plotting against the imperial family, after which they were both executed.

== Life ==
Sima Liang was the fourth son of Sima Yi, by his concubine, Lady Fu; he was the eldest among Lady Fu's four sons and probably the eldest among Sima Yi's six sons whose mothers were concubines. (Note: The Book of Jin recorded the age order of Lady Fu's four sons.) His younger full-brothers were Sima Zhou, Sima Jing and Sima Jun. During the regencies within Cao Wei by his older half-brothers Sima Shi and Sima Zhao, he served as a mid-level official. After his nephew Sima Yan (posthumously known as Emperor Wu of Jin) ended Cao Wei and established the Jin dynasty, Sima Liang was created the Prince of Fufeng on 9 February 266 and put in charge of the military commands of Qin (秦州, modern eastern Gansu) and Yong (雍州, modern central and northern Shaanxi) provinces. In 270, after his subordinate, the general Liu Qi (劉旂) was defeated by the Xianbei rebel Tufa Shujineng, Sima Liang tried to have Liu's life spared by claiming fault; Liu's life was spared, but Sima Liang lost his post as a result. He was replaced by his younger brother Sima Jun.

Despite this, Sima Liang was well respected among the Jin imperial clan for his virtues, including his filial devotion to Princess Dowager Fu. Because of this, Emperor Wu put him in charge of monitoring the imperial princes' behavior, to correct and rebuke them when necessary.

On 5 October 277, Emperor Wu moved Sima Liang's principality to Ru'nan and put him in charge of the military commands of Yu Province (豫州, modern eastern Henan). However, soon he recalled Sima Liang back to the capital to serve as a high-level advisor.

As Emperor Wu grew ill in 289, he considered whom to make regent. He considered both Empress Yang Zhi's father Yang Jun and Sima Liang. As a result, Yang Jun became fearful of Sima Liang and had him posted to the key city of Xuchang. Several other imperial princes were also posted to other key cities in the empire. By 290, Emperor Wu resolved to let Yang and Sima Liang both be regents, but after he wrote his will, the will was seized by Yang Jun, who instead had another will promulgated in which Yang alone was named regent. Emperor Wu died soon thereafter in May and was succeeded by Emperor Hui. By this point, Sima Liang had not yet gone to Xuchang, but was fearful of Yang Jun, and so did not dare to attend Emperor Wu's wake. Yang was still suspicious that Sima Liang might have a coup in mind, and so prepared for his troops to attack Sima Liang. (Indeed, the justice minister He Xu (何勗) suggested to Sima Liang that he overthrow Yang, but Sima Liang refused.) In order to avoid a military confrontation with Yang, Sima Liang immediately left for Xuchang.

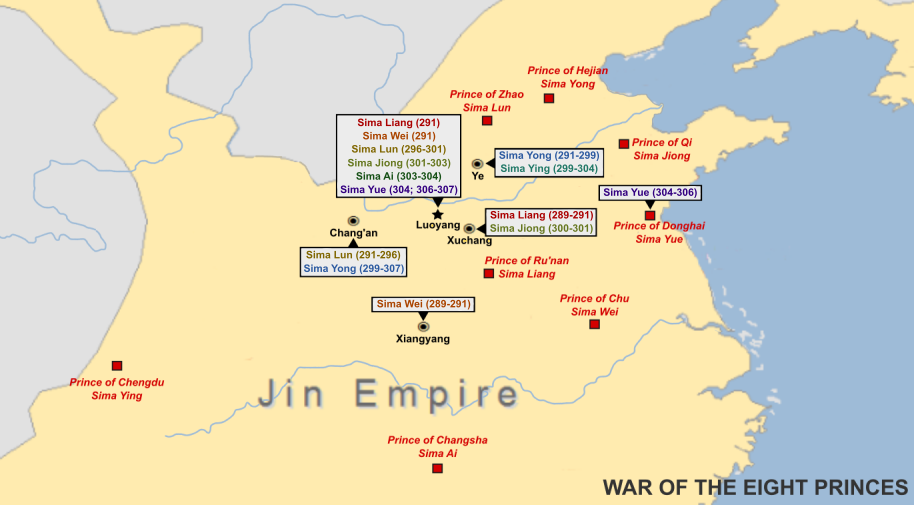
Map showing the Wars of the Eight Princes

After Empress Jia Nanfeng, Emperor Hui's wife, in conjunction with Emperor Hui's brother Sima Wei the Prince of Chu, overthrew and killed Yang in a coup in April 291, Sima Liang, as the most respected of the imperial princes, was summoned back to the capital Luoyang to serve as regent on 4 May, along with Wei Guan. To appease those who might have been angry and had overthrown Yang Jun, Sima Liang widely promoted those who participated in the plot, and more than a thousand men were created marquesses. He and Wei, however, did try to get the government on track, but Empress Jia continued to interfere with governmental matters. They also became concerned about the violent temper of Sima Wei and therefore tried to strip him of his military command, but Sima Wei persuaded Empress Jia to let him keep his military command. Sima Wei's assistants Qi Sheng (岐盛) and Gongsun Hong (公孫宏) thereafter falsely told Empress Jia that Sima Liang and Wei planned to depose the emperor. Empress Jia, who had already resented Wei for having, during Emperor Wu's reign, suggested that he change his heir selection, also wanted more direct control over the government, and therefore resolved to plot a second coup.

In summer 291, Empress Jia had Emperor Hui personally write an edict to Sima Wei, ordering him to have Sima Liang and Wei Guan removed from their offices. His forces thereby surrounded Sima Liang and Wei Guan's mansions, and while both men's subordinates recommended resistance, each declined and was captured. Against what the edict said, both were killed—Sima Liang with his heir Sima Ju (司馬矩) and Wei Guan with nine of his sons and grandsons. Initially, the soldiers respected Sima Liang and did not dare to kill him, and indeed, as he sat in the prisoner's wagon, it appeared clear that he was suffering from the heat, and passersby were allowed to use fans to try to alleviate his suffering. Only after Sima Wei issued an order that whoever dared to cut off Sima Liang's head would receive a large sum of silk as reward did someone carry out the execution. After Empress Jia, concerned about Sima Wei's power, then falsely declared that the edict was forged by Sima Wei and had him executed, Sima Liang was posthumously honored.

== Family ==
Based on historical records, Sima Liang had at least five sons:

- Sima Sui (司馬粹), courtesy name Maohong (茂弘), died young and had no issue.
- Sima Ju (司馬矩), courtesy name Yanming (延明), was killed along with his father. As he was his father's heir when he died, he was posthumously known as Prince Huai of Ru'nan. Ju's son You inherited the princedom of Ru'nan and later went south to join Sima Rui (the future Emperor Yuan of Jin).
- Sima Yang (司馬羕), courtesy name Yannian (延年)
- Sima Zong (司馬宗), courtesy name Yanzuo (延祚) also went south to join Sima Rui, but was eventually killed by Rui's in-law Yu Liang, (Note: Rui's son Sima Shao married Yu Liang's younger sister Yu Wenjun.) who was regent during the reign of Rui's grandson Emperor Cheng.
- Sima Xi (司馬熙), courtesy name unknown, was initially appointed Duke of Ruyang. Due to his merits in the expedition against Liu Qiao, he was made a prince. In 311, he was captured by Shi Le, either in the aftermath of Sima Yue's death or during the Disaster of Yongjia.

Sima Liang also had at least two daughters, who respectively married Pei Yu, eldest son of Pei Kai (and eldest brother of Pei Xian), and Xiahou Jun, son of Xiahou Wei. It was because of the marriage ties that Pei Kai set out to rescue Sima Liang's son Sima Yang in the aftermath of Liang's death in July 291.
