= Li Han (Jin dynasty) =

Jin dynasty minister (died 303)

- 李含

Intendant of Henan (河南尹)
- In office 303 – c.August 303
- Monarch: Emperor Hui of Jin

Personal details
- Born: Unknown Lintao County, Gansu
- Died: c.August 303 Luoyang, Henan
- Courtesy name: Shirong (世容)

Li Han (Note: not to be confused with Li Te's brother-in-law who had the same name) (died c.August 303), courtesy name Shirong, was an official of the Jin dynasty (266–420). A subordinate of the Prince of Hejian, Sima Yong, his feud with the brothers Huangfu Shang and Huangfu Zhong, was a driving factor in the War of the Eight Princes. To eliminate the brothers, Li Han influenced his prince into first attacking the Prince of Qi, Sima Jiong and then the Prince of Changsha, Sima Ai. He was killed after his plot to assassinate Sima Ai was discovered.

== Early life and career ==
Li Han was born into a humble family from Didao County, Longxi Commandery. He was described as being gifted from a young age, and he later moved to Shiping Commandery (始平郡), where he was nominated as xiaolian by both Shiping and Longxi.

Around this time (c.late 270s to early 280s), (Note: Guo Yi's biography in Jin Shu recorded that he was made Inspector of Yong province early in the Xianning era (275-280), and became Master of Writing (尚書) during the Taikang era (280-289); he died in 287 (8th year of the Taikang era).) Li Han met Huangfu Shang, a member of a prominent gentry family from Anding Commandery. Shang initially took pity on Li Han due to his background and attempted to befriend him, but Li Han snubbed him. Angered by his rejection, Shang wrote and circulated a short disparaging letter about him throughout Qin province, which led to Li Han being given the low-ranking position of Gate Chief. However, the Inspector of Yong province, Guo Yi (郭奕; nephew of Guo Huai) had known of Li Han's talents, so after a meeting between the two, he made him a member of his staff as an Assistant Officer at Chang'an. (Note: Guo Yi's biography also recorded that he became well-known for spotting talent after his elevation of Li and Li's subsequent developments.)

Li Han became a xiucai and was then recommended to serve in a government office. He was summoned to the capital, Luoyang to serve as Assistant of the Grand Protector and the Prefect of the Gentlemen of the Palace of Qin State. Afterwards, the Minister Over the Masses appointed him as Rectifier of Shiping Commandery. When the Prince of Qin, Sima Jian (司馬柬; Emperor Hui's only full brother to live to adulthood) died in 291, Li Han was ordered to bury him in accordance with the ceremonial rites and carry out the mourning period. After he ended the period, the Master of Writing, Zhao Jun (趙浚), (Note: It is unknown if this Zhao Jun is the same person as Empress Yang Yan's maternal uncle, whose known official post was Military Protector of the Palace (中护军).) who hated Li Han for refusing to serve under him, reported that Li Han should not have released himself from mourning. Despite the minister Fu Xian (傅咸; son of Fu Xuan) submitting a memorial in his defense, Emperor Hui did not listen, and the Grand Rectifier, Fu Zhi (傅祗; son of Fu Gu) had him demoted to the fifth rank and sent back to Chang'an.

Back in Chang'an, the imperial household appointed him as a Supervisor of the Granary. Eventually, the Minister Over the Masses, Wang Rong appealed on Li Han's behalf, arguing that a minister as high-ranking as he was should not have been demoted to the position he currently had. Emperor Hui agreed and ordered Li Han to drop his post. He was later appointed as the Magistrate of Shiping.

== War of the Eight Princes ==
=== Coalition of the Three Princes ===
In February 301, the Prince of Zhao, Sima Lun usurped the throne from Emperor Hui. During this time, someone informed Lun's chief assistant, Sun Xiu of Li Han's talents, and so he was promoted to the Magistrate of Dongwuyang. The Prince of Hejian, Sima Yong petitioned for Li Han to serve under him as his Marshal Who Attacks the West. Under Yong, Li Han became a trusted official, and he was soon promoted to Chief Clerk.

Later that year, the Prince of Qi, Sima Jiong launched a coalition to depose Sima Lun and restore Emperor Hui. A former official, Xiahou Shi (夏侯奭) began raising an army at Shiping intending to support Sima Jiong and sent a messenger to Sima Yong urging him to join. Yong consulted with Li Han for his next step, and Li Han advised that they should join forces with Lun and attack Xiahou Shi. Yong sent his generals, Zhang Fang and Fang Yang (房陽) to attack Xiahou, defeating and capturing him before executing him with his subordinates at Chang'an. Li Han also advised Yong to arrest and send an envoy from Jiong to Lun, and have Zhang Fang lead his generals to defend Luoyang.

However, Yong decided to switch sides after learning that the coalition were stronger in number. He appointed Li Han as Prancing Dragon General and ordered him to instruct the generals to hold back Zhang Fang's army. After Li Han joined Zhang Fang, they advanced to Tong Pass to support Sima Yong. In May 301, Sima Lun was overthrown in a coup and Emperor Hui was restored. Upon hearing this news, Li Han led his army to return to Chang'an.

=== Conspiracy against Sima Jiong ===
When Sima Lun was defeated, Huangfu Shang was serving as the Inspector of Liang province. He was distressed by the news, as he had been favoured by the prince beforehand, so he went to Chang'an and sought permission from Sima Yong to resign. Yong comforted Shang and allowed him to make his way to Luoyang, even holding a banquet to send him off. However, Li Han still held a grudge against Shang and warned his prince not to make any contact with him, which angered Shang. Although Yong was aware about their feud, he remained impartial and tolerated both of them.

In 302, the imperial court summoned Li Han to Luoyang again to appoint him as the Colonel Who Assists the Army. At the time, Huangfu Shang and the brother of Xiahou Shi were serving under Sima Jiong, who was Emperor Hui's regent. Li Han was also at odds with Jiong's marshal, Zhao Xiang (趙驤), (Note: Zhao Xiang was a son of Zhao Jun, a maternal uncle of Empress Yang Yan. When Zhao Jun was killed by Sima Lun, Zhao Xiang was spared. However, Zhao Xiang later joined Sima Ying and attacked Sima Lun. After Lu Yun was captured by Sima Ying, Lu Zhi used this precedent to persuade Sima Ying to execute Lu Yun.) which made Jiong wary of him. Suspecting he was in danger, Li Han fled on his own and returned to Chang'an, pretending that he had received a secret imperial decree to overthrow Sima Jiong. Li Han presented the decree to Sima Yong at night and advised him:

"The Prince of Chengdu (Sima Ying) is a close relative, has made great contributions and has won the hearts of the people since returning to his domain. Meanwhile, the Prince of Qi (Sima Jiong) has been acting much like the emperor and monopolizing his power, while the court can only glance at him from the sides. We should herald the Prince of Qi by first sending an order to the Prince of Changsha (Sima Ai) to attack him; the Prince of Qi will surely have him punished. Afterwards, we send a letter accusing the Prince of Qi of his crimes, and only then can we capture Sima Jiong. Exile the Prince of Qi and instate the Prince of Chengdu in his place. That way, you will free yourself from pressure and form friendly ties, thus securing the safety of the state. This will be a great achievement."

Sima Yong followed his advice, and in January 303, he sent a petition throughout the empire denouncing Sima Jiong, with specific orders to Sima Ai in Luoyang asking him to depose him. He also appointed Li Han as Chief Controller and ordered him to lead Zhang Fang and others towards the capital. Li Han passed through Yinpan County (陰盤縣) and camped close to Luoyang. Sima Ai, after receiving Sima Yong's order engaged in a three-day battle with Sima Jiong in the city. Unexpectedly, Sima Ai defeated Sima Jiong and executed him. With Sima Jiong dead, Li Han withdrew his forces.

=== Conspiracy against Sima Ai and death ===
Li Han was dissatisfied that his plan to install Sima Yong and Sima Ying to power did not went as planned, with part of his frustration stemming from his desire to seize real political power for himself. When Sima Ai took control of the imperial court, he also continued to employ Huangfu Shang as an Army Adviser. All the while, Shang's brother, Huangfu Zhong, was serving as the Inspector of Qin province. Li Han advised Sima Yong that the two brothers cannot be trusted and should be removed from power. He proposed a plan petitioning the court to recall Huangfu Zhong back to Luoyang before arresting him en route.

However, Zhong saw through their plot and believed that Li Han was planning to rebel, so he asked Sima Ai for permission to use the soldiers of Qin province to suppress him. Sima Ai did not want to escalate the situation any further, so he ordered Zhong to disband his troops and appointed Li Han as Intendant of Henan and moved to Luoyang. Li Han complied but Zhong refused. From Luoyang, Li Han remained in touch with Sima Yong, and suggested to him to use the Prefect of Jincheng, You Kai (游楷) and the Prefect of Longxi, Han Zhi (韓稚) to attack Huangfu Zhong at Jicheng (冀城; in present-day Gangu County, Gansu). (Note: Li Han's biography in Book of Jin recorded that it was Sima Yong who appointed Li Han Intendant of Henan. In his Zizhi Tongjian Kaoyi, Sima Guang recorded that Tongjian adopted the account found in Huangfu Zhong's biography.)

Not long after, Sima Yong secretly ordered Li Han to attack Sima Ai with the Palace Attendant, Feng Sun (馮蓀) (Note: Feng Sun was a son of Feng Bo, son of Feng Dan (冯𬘘). Feng Dan's grandfather Feng Fu was also known as Li Fu.) and Prefect of the Palace Writers, Bian Cui (卞粹). However, before they could act, Huangfu Shang warned Sima Ai about Li Han's involvement in the previous plot against Sima Jiong. Thus, Li Han and his co-conspirators were all captured and killed.
