= Huangfu Zhong =

Western Jin official (died 305)

- 皇甫重

Inspector of Qin province (秦州刺史)
- In office ?–305
- Monarch: Emperor Hui of Jin

Personal details
- Born: Unknown Chaona, Gansu
- Died: c.May 305 Gangu County, Gansu
- Relations: Huangfu Shang (brother)
- Children: Huangfu Chang (adopted)
- Courtesy name: Lunshu (倫叔)

Huangfu Zhong (died c.May 305), courtesy name Lunshu, was a military general of the Jin dynasty (266–420). During the War of the Eight Princes, he was forced into war with the Prince of Hejian, Sima Yong and became an ally to the Prince of Changsha, Sima Ai. He held out in the city of Jicheng (冀城; in present-day Gangu County, Gansu) for three years, even after Sima Ai had been executed, before he was betrayed and killed by his followers.

== Life ==
Huangfu Zhong was a member of the prestigious Huangfu clan of Chaona County, Anding Commandery. He was described as calm and resolute with great talents. The Minister of Works, Zhang Hua took notice of him and appointed him the Prefect of Xinping Commandery. During the Yuankang era (291–299), Zhang Hua assigned him as Inspector of Qin province and was stationed at Jicheng

In 302, the Prince of Changsha, Sima Ai, who held control over Emperor Hui of Jin and the imperial court in Luoyang, appointed Huangfu Zhong's younger brother, Huangfu Shang as his Army Adviser. At the time, the Prince of Hejian, Sima Yong was guarding the Guanzhong region, and his advisor, Li Han, had long despised the Huangfu brothers. Li Han proposed a plan to his prince to get rid of the brothers, first by presenting an edict to the court to recall Huangfu Zhong from Qin before arresting him as he passed through their territory. However, Zhong discovered their plans and sent a letter to the Master of Writing accusing Li Han of rebellion and asking for permission to suppress him. Sima Ai, who only recently put down a rebellion, attempted to defuse the situation by ordering Zhong to disband his army and transferring Li Han away from Chang'an by appointing him the Intendant of Henan. Li Han complied but Zhong refused, so Sima Yong ordered the Administrator of Jincheng, You Kai (游楷), the Administrator of Longxi, Han Zhi (韓稚) and others to lead troops out of four commanderies to attack Zhong at Jicheng.

In 303, Sima Yong and the Prince of Chengdu, Sima Ying declared war on Sima Ai, and Yong sent his general, Zhang Fang to besiege Luoyang. Sima Ai allied himself with the Inspector of Yong province, Liu Chen, who coordinated with Huangfu Zhong against Sima Yong. Liu Chen entrusted Zhong with important affairs, but Zhong was also said to have refused advice from one of his allies, Zhang Guang, due to his low family status. Sima Ai also sent Huangfu Shang with an imperial edict hoping to convince You Kai and the others to disband, but Shang was captured and killed by Sima Yong along the way.

In 304, Sima Ai was arrested by his subordinates and burned alive by Zhang Fang at Luoyang. Not long after, Liu Chen was also defeated and executed despite his forces initially managing to break into Chang'an. Huangfu Zhong continued to resist from Jicheng and blocked out all outer gates of the city so that the city inhabitants were unaware with how the war was going. You Kai and the others tried building earthen mounds to breach into the city, but Zhong and his defenders employed repeating crossbows to shoot down their builders. Zhong also dug a depression around the city to prevent them from entering through underground tunnels. He was able to adapt his tactics according to the situation while his soldiers defended zealously, so the enemies were unable to get close to the city.

In 305, as the siege entered its third year, Sima Yong felt that he could not take Jicheng by force, so he sent an Imperial Censor to present an edict ordering Huangfu Zhong to surrender. Zhong was not convinced that the edict came from the court and refused to heed it. At the time, the people of Jicheng did not know that both Sima Ai and Huangfu Shang were dead. Zhong enquired with the Censor's chariot driver regarding the reinforcements that his brother was supposed to bring, to which he replied that Sima Yong had already killed him. Zhong was shocked by this revelation and killed the driver, but news of Shang's death leaked out nonetheless. The city inhabitants, realizing that help was not coming, turned on Zhong and killed him before surrendering.

== Family ==
=== Huangfu Chang ===
Huangfu Chang (皇甫昌; died 305) was the adopted son of Huangfu Zhong. In 305, his father sent him to request for reinforcements from the Prince of Donghai, Sima Yue. Though Yue had fought against Sima Yong, he had only recently made peace, so he denied their request. Instead, Chang went to Luoyang where he met with the minister, Yang Pian (楊篇), presenting him a forged edict which he claimed was from Sima Yue ordering him get the empress, Yang Xianrong from her house arrest at Jinyong Fortress (金墉城; near Luoyang). Chang then entered the palace and through the empress's authority instructed the ministers to raise soldiers against Zhang Fang and prepare the imperial carriage to rescue Emperor Hui from Chang'an. The ministers believed him at first and made preparations, but when it was soon found out that the edict was a forgery, they had Huangfu Chang executed.
