= Huangfu Shang =

Military general of the Jin dynasty (266–420) (died 303)

- 皇甫商

Inspector of Liang province (涼州刺史)
- In office ?–301
- Monarch: Emperor Hui of Jin

Personal details
- Born: Unknown Chaona, Gansu
- Died: c.December 303 Binzhou, Shaanxi
- Relations: Huangfu Zhong (brother)

Huangfu Shang (died c.December 303) was a military general of the Jin dynasty (266–420). Arising from his personal rivalry with the official Li Han, he became a central figure in the conflict between the Prince of Changsha, Sima Ai and the Prince of Hejian, Sima Yong in the War of the Eight Princes. His alleged abuse of power was used as a pretext for Sima Yong and the Prince of Chengdu, Sima Ying to declare war on Sima Ai. He was later killed while on his way to help lift a siege on his elder brother, Huangfu Zhong.

== Life ==
Huangfu Shang was a member of the Huangfu clan of Anding Commandery, a prominent gentry family in northwestern China. He was a confidant of the Prince of Zhao, Sima Lun and reached the office of Inspector of Liang province. In an unspecified year, he met a native of Longxi Commandery named Li Han. Taking pity on his humble background, Shang wanted to befriend him, but was snubbed. In his anger, he wrote a disparaging letter about Li Han and circulated it around Qin province. As a result, Li Han was looked down upon and was given a low-ranking position early in his career.

In 301, Sima Lun usurped the throne from Emperor Hui of Jin; he was later deposed and forced to commit suicide. Huangfu Shang became fearful for his life as he had been an associate of the prince. He abandoned his post in Liang and went to Chang'an, where he offered the Prince of Hejian, Sima Yong his resignation. Yong comforted Shang and even held a banquet before allowing him to make his way to the capital, Luoyang. However, Li Han, now a close advisor of Yong, still held a grudge against Shang, so he warned his prince about Shang's past dealings with Sima Lun and advised him not to contact him any further. Shang was furious when he found out, but despite knowing of their feud, Yong remained impartial and refused to take a side.

At Luoyang, the Prince of Qi and emperor's regent, Sima Jiong appointed him as an Army Adviser. In 302, Li Han was summoned to the capital to be given an appointment, but he was reluctant for several reasons, including the fact that Huangfu Shang was on Sima Jiong's staff. Instead, Li Han concocted a plan with Sima Yong to remove Jiong from power and assert their control over the imperial court. However, the plan went awry when the Prince of Changsha, Sima Ai managed to kill Jiong in Luoyang and took Emperor Hui of Jin under his care. Huangfu Shang was spared in the aftermath and continued to serve as Army Adviser under Sima Ai. He was also appointed as the General of the Left.

Li Han was frustrated that his plan had failed, even more so as Shang remained in an influential position. Additionally, his elder brother, Huangfu Zhong was also serving as the Inspector of Qin province at the time. Li Han plotted with Sima Yong to get rid of the Huangfu brothers, but Zhong saw through their plans and raised an army against Li Han. Sima Ai ordered Zhong to disperse his army and summoned Li Han to Luoyang to serve as the Intendant of Henan. Zhong refused and Li Han complied, but he, along with Palace Attendant, Feng Sun (馮蓀) and Prefect of the Palace Writers, Bian Cui (卞粹), received a secret order from Yong to assassinate Ai. However, Shang was aware that Li Han had been involved in the conspiracy against Sima Jiong and soon uncovered the assassination plot. He informed Ai about the plot, and the conspirators were all executed.

With Li Han dead, Sima Yong allied with the Prince of Chengdu, Sima Ying and declared war on Sima Ai. In a joint petition condemning Sima Ai, Huangfu Shang and the consort kin Yang Xuanzhi (father of Yang Xianrong) were specifically named to be put to death. On 21 September 303, Ai sent Shang to attack Yong's general, Zhang Fang at Yiyang (宜陽, in modern Luoyang, Henan). However, on 8 October, Zhang Fang attacked and routed Shang with a hidden army, causing his soldiers to scatter. Ai attempted to negotiate peace with Sima Ying, but Ying demanded that he execute Huangfu Shang and his accomplices first, which he refused.

While Sima Ai was besieged at Luoyang, Huangfu Zhong was also under siege by Sima Yong's forces at Jicheng (冀城; in present-day Gangu County, Gansu). Ai ordered Huangfu Shang to travel along the byroads to present Yong's generals with an edict from the emperor, so to convince them to disband and allow Zhong to attack Yong. Shang took the byroads and reached Xinping Commandery (新平郡; around present-day Bin County, Shaanxi), where he met a son of his paternal cousin (a daughter of his father's brother). This relative hated Shang, so he informed Sima Yong of Shang's whereabouts, leading to Shang's capture and execution.
