= Liu Chen (Jin dynasty) =

Jin dynasty official (died 304)

- 劉沈

Inspector of Yong province (雍州刺史)
- In office ?–304
- Monarch: Emperor Hui of Jin

Personal details
- Born: Unknown Daxing, Beijing
- Died: 304
- Parent: Liu Dai (father)
- Courtesy name: Daozhen (道真)

Liu Chen (died c.March 304), courtesy name Daozhen, was a military general of the Jin dynasty (266–420). He is most known for his role in the War of the Eight Princes, where as Inspector of Yong province, he sided with the Prince of Changsha, Sima Ai when he was placed under siege at Luoyang by the Prince of Hejian, Sima Yong.

== Life ==
=== Early life and career ===
Liu Chen was a native of Ji County, Yan state and the son of the minister, Liu Dai (劉岱). His family had been part of the gentry for several generations, and he was serving in the provincial administration from an early age. He was described as well-educated and enjoyed reading the classics, while also revering Confucianism and respecting wise men. In 290, the Grand Protector, Wei Guan invited him to serve under him as a Senior Clerk and appointed him the Grand Rectifier of his home state.

There was a man from Guangyang Commandery named Huo Yuan (霍原) who was known for his integrity. Liu Dai, who was a friend of Huo Yuan's father, wanted to recommend Huo for office, but died before he could do so. Liu Chen wanted to fulfill his father's wishes, so he recommended Huo Yuan as a second-rank official. The Minister of Justice did not accept at first, prompting Liu Chen to submit a petition for appeal. In the end, the Secretariat Supervisor, Zhang Hua agreed to Liu Chen's petition. When Zhang Hua was wrongly convicted in 300, Liu Chen represented him in his defence. Though he was unable to save Zhang Hua's life, his arguments were clear and sound, which garnered him praises at the time.

In 301, the Prince of Qi and emperor's regent, Sima Jiong recruited Liu Chen as his Chief Clerk of the Left and promoted him to a Palace Attendant. That same year, refugees in the Ba and Shu region, led by the Ba Di chieftain, Li Te, had rebelled. Emperor Hui of Jin ordered Liu Chen to assist the Inspector of Yi province, Luo Shang and the Inspector of Liang province, Xu Xiong (許雄) in putting down the rebels. Liu Chen stopped at Chang'an along the way, where the Prince of Hejian, Sima Yong retained him as a Military Advisor. Yong sent Xi Wei (席薳) instead to fight the rebels, while Liu Chen was later appointed Inspector of Yong province.

In 303, a major revolt broke out in Jiangxia Commandery led by the Man official, Zhang Chang. Emperor Hui ordered Liu Chen to lead 10,000 provincial soldiers and 5,000 soldiers from the Western Expeditionary force to suppress the revolt, which Sima Yong objected. Liu Chen ignored Sima Yong and led his soldiers to out of Lantian County, but Yong forcibly deprived him of his army. Later, the Prince of Changsha, Sima Ai, who held control over the emperor, ordered Liu Chen to return to Yong province with 400 military officers.

=== Alliance with Sima Ai ===
In fall of that same year, Sima Yong raised an army against Sima Ai and sent his general, Zhang Fang to besiege Luoyang with 70,000 troops. A few months into the siege, Sima Ai followed his official, Zu Ti's advice to form an alliance with Liu Chen so that he would attack Sima Yong at Chang'an and divert Zhang Fang's attention away from Luoyang. Upon receiving a secret imperial edict from Ai, Liu Chen swiftly sent out proclamations to the counties of Yong province, with most of them responding to his call to arms. Liu Chen led more than 10,000 soldiers from seven commanderies towards Chang'an, with the Administrator of Anding, Wei Bo (衛博), the Administrator of Xinping, Zhang Guang and the Officer of Merit of Anding, Huangfu Dan (皇甫澹) all serving as his vanguard. He also cooperated with and entrusted important affairs to the Inspector of Qin province, Huangfu Zhong, who had rebelled against Sima Yong earlier.

In 304, Sima Yong stationed himself at Gaoping Pavilion (高平亭) in Zheng county (鄭縣; present-day Hua County, Shaanxi) to act as reserves for Zhang Fang. When he heard that Liu Chen had risen up against him, he marched back to Weicheng (渭城; in present-day Xianyang, Shaanxi) to defend the area. He sent the Chief Controller, Yu Kui (虞夔) with 10,000 cavalry and infantry to fight Liu Chen at Haozhi County (好畤縣, in modern Xianyang, Shaanxi). However, Liu Chen marched from Xinping Commandery (新平郡; around present-day Bin County, Shaanxi) and routed Yu Kui, causing Sima Yong to panic and withdraw into Chang'an. He then urgently ordered Zhang Fang to return from Luoyang.

Liu Chen crossed the Wei River and built a fortress. After defeating Yong's forces several time, he sent Wei Bo and Huangfu Dan with 5,000 soldiers to attack Chang'an gate. The detachment had initial success and even reached Sima Yong's camp within the city, but Liu Chen's main force were too slow to help them. Yong soon realized that the detachment had no support, and his troops morale doubled. The Administrator of Pingyi, Zhang Fu led his forces to reinforce Sima Yong and attacked Huangfu Dan from his flank. Wei Bo and his sons were killed in battle, while Huangfu Dan was captured. Yong, admiring Dan's bravery, tried to spare his life, but after he refused to submit, he had him executed. The surviving troops all fled back to Liu Chen's camp.

Once Zhang Fang arrived back from Luoyang, he sent his general, Dun Wei (敦偉) to carry out a night attack on the enemy camp. Liu Chen's forces were caught by surprise and collapsed, prompting him to flee south with just over a hundred of his men, but was captured by the Magistrate of Chencang. When brought before Sima Yong, Liu Chen said to him, "The favour between friends is slight, but the favour of the three principles (father, teacher and lord) is greater. I could not disobey the edict of my sovereign and weigh the strengths and weaknesses to save myself. The day I shook my sleeves was the day I knew that my life was in danger. The death of being chopped to minced meat will be as sweet to me as tasting the shepherd's purse." Furiously, Sima Yong had him whipped and cut him by the waist. Many felt pity when they saw Liu Chen, while a few of them felt that the emperor's demise was close.
