= Sima Tan (Jin dynasty) =

Crown prince of the Western Jin (295–308)

Sima Tan 司馬覃

Crown Prince of the Jin dynasty
- Tenure: 6 July 302 – 1 May 304
- Predecessor: Sima Shang
- Successor: Sima Ying

Prince of Qinghe (清河王)
- Tenure: 15 July 300 – 6 July 302; 1 May 304 – 24 March 308
- Predecessor: Sima Xia
- Born: 295
- Died: 24 March 308 (aged 13)
- House: Jin dynasty
- Father: Sima Xia
- Mother: Lady Zhou

Sima Tan (Note: The character "覃" has multiple pronunciations: "qín", "tán", "yǎn" and "xún".) (295 – 24 March 308) was a crown prince of the Western Jin. He was installed to the position in 302 to serve as heir apparent for his uncle, Emperor Hui of Jin, but was removed in 304. After his removal, there were several plots to restore him to the position before he was finally put to death by the Prince of Donghai, Sima Yue in 308.

== Life ==
=== Background ===
Sima Tan was born the eldest son to Sima Xia (司馬遐; 273 - 15 July 300), Prince Kang of Qinghe and the 13th son of Emperor Wu of Jin, and Xia's wife Lady Zhou (周氏). Lady Zhou's father was Zhou Hui (周恢) (Note: Zhou Hui was praised by his paternal cousin Zhou Jun (father of Zhou Yi) in front of Emperor Wu. At the same occasion, Jun also praised another cousin, Zhou Fu.) and her mother Lady Sima was a paternal aunt of Sima Yue, Prince Xiaoxian of Donghai, and a daughter of Sima Kui, a younger brother of Sima Xia's great-grandfather Sima Yi. According to a story in his biography in the Book of Jin, while Tan was still his father's heir, he wore a golden bell that one day shrivelled up like millet. A fortune teller believe that the gold represented the prosperity of the Jin dynasty, and was a good omen for Tan who would one day ascend the imperial throne. However, his paternal grandmother, Consort Dowager Chen (陳太妃), thought that the bell was a bad sign, so she broke it and had it sold instead. After his father's death in July 300, Sima Tan inherited his title.

=== As crown prince and removals ===
By May 302, the last of Emperor Hui's male descendants (sons of his only son Sima Yu, Crown Prince Minhuai) had died, leaving him with no heir to succeed him. The Prince of Chengdu, Sima Ying, Hui's younger half-brother, was a leading candidate to succeed him. However, the emperor's regent, the Prince of Qi, Sima Jiong intervened and petitioned that Hui's nephew, the 7-year-old Sima Tan, should succeed him instead. (Note: Sima Jiong's memorial to the throne, recorded in Book of Jin, mentioned Tan's heritage, and compared Lady Zhou to Empress Dowager Bo, mother of Emperor Wen of Han and concubine of Emperor Gaozu.) Emperor Hui agreed, and on 6 July 302, Sima Tan was appointed crown prince.

However, in May 304, Sima Ying took control of the central government (Note: Sima Jiong was killed in January 303, while Emperor Hui's next regent Sima Ai was killed in March 304.) and took the position of crown prince for himself, demoting Sima Tan back to the Prince of Qinghe. Later that year, while Sima Ying was in Ye, the Prince of Donghai, Sima Yue, rebelled in Luoyang and restored Sima Tan to his previous position. Yue then led a campaign against Ying, but after he was defeated at the Battle of Dangyin, he fled back to his fief in Donghai. His generals, Shangguan Si (上官巳), Chen Zhen (陳眕) and others, retreated back to Luoyang with Sima Tan under their wing.

Real power in Luoyang was held by Shangguan Si, and as he became increasingly cruel and violent, the ministers, Zhou Fu and Man Fen attempted to depose him but failed. The Prince of Hejian, Sima Yong, sent his general, Zhang Fang to occupy Luoyang. Shangguan Si and Miao Yuan (苗願) went out to fight Zhang Fang but were defeated and forced back into the city. One night, Sima Tan launched a surprise attack on Shangguan Si and Miao Yun, causing the two men to flee the city. Tan welcomed Zhang Fang through the Guangyang Gate (廣陽門) and saluted him, so much so that Zhang Fang had to get down his carriage to stop him. Despite the warm welcome, Zhang Fang soon confirmed his deposition as crown prince and replaced him with Emperor Hui's half-brother, Sima Chi in February 305.

In January 307, after Sima Yue emerged victorious in the War of the Eight Princes, Emperor Hui died from being poisoned and Sima Chi was to succeed him. However, Hui's widow, Yang Xianrong wanted to become Empress Dowager, so she attempted to install Sima Tan to the throne instead. She summoned Sima Tan ostensibly to have him serve as a Master of Writing, but at the same time, the minister Hua Hun (華混; great-grandson of Hua Xin) rebuked her and also called Sima Yue and Sima Chi to the palace. Sima Tan sensed that something was amiss, so he claimed illness and left. As a result, Sima Chi ascended the throne and became posthumously known as Emperor Huai of Jin.

Sima Tan also received support from certain ministers within the imperial court who want him to take the throne. In February or March 307, not long after Emperor Huai's ascension, Tan's maternal uncle, Zhou Mu (周穆) (Note: Zhou Mu's mother was a paternal aunt of Sima Yue, being a daughter of Sima Kui (Yue's grandfather and younger brother of Sima Yi).) and Zhou Mu's brother-in-law Zhuge Mei (諸葛玫; brother of Emperor Wu's concubine Lady Zhuge Wan and grandson of Zhuge Xu) both advised Sima Yue to replace him with Sima Tan, citing that Huai had been illegitimately installed by Zhang Fang. However, Yue angrily refused and immediately ordered the two men to be executed. On 8 May 307, Sima Tan's brother, Sima Quan (司馬詮 (Note: This name is per Zizhi Tongjian. In Jin Shu, his name was written as "铨", with the same pronunciation.)) was made crown prince to Emperor Huai.

=== Death and aftermath ===
At the end of 307, there was a plot to establish Sima Tan as crown prince by Lü Yong (呂雍), Chen Yan (陳顏) and others. However, Sima Yue discovered the plot, and now convinced that Tan would only cause further trouble, he forged an edict imprisoning him at Jinyong Fortress (金墉城) near Luoyang. Finally, on 24 March 308, Sima Yue killed the 14-year-old (by East Asian reckoning) Sima Tan and had him buried with commoner rites. His brother Sima Yue (司马籥), who was Prince of Xincai after Sima Teng's death in June or July 307, was made the new Prince of Qinghe. Sima Quan eventually died in the Disaster of Yongjia in July 311; their brother Sima Duan (司马端) fled to join Gou Xi and was made crown prince by Gou. However, Duan and Gou were captured by Shi Le in October. While Gou was eventually executed in c.November, Sima Duan's fate was unknown although he was assumed to be killed by Shi as well.
