= Lu Zhi (Jin dynasty) =

4th-century Chinese minister

- 盧志

Chief of the Palace Secretariat (中書監)
- Monarch: Emperor Hui of Jin
- In office 304–305

Personal details
- Born: Unknown Zhuozhou, Hebei
- Died: 312 or 315 Linfen, Shanxi
- Spouse(s): Lady Cui from the Cui clan of Qinghe (daughter of Cui Can, maternal aunt of Wen Jiao and sister of Liu Kun's wife) (Note: Lu Chen's biography in Book of Jin recorded that his maternal aunt was Liu Kun's wife, while Cui Yue's biography in the same work recorded that he was a great-grandson of Cui Lin and a paternal nephew of Liu Kun's wife.) (Note: The biography of Liu Kun's son Liu Qun in Book of Jin recorded that Wen Jiao wrote in memorials that Liu Qun was his yidi, while Cui Yue and Lu Chen were his maternal cousins. The term yidi is ambiguous as it can mean the younger brother or son of one's maternal aunt or one's wife.) (Note: A Wei Shu Pu annotation in A New Account of the Tales of the World recorded that Wen Dan (Wen Jiao's father) married a daughter of Cui Can.)
- Relations: Lu Zhi (great-grandfather)
- Children: Lu Chen (285 - c.April 351) (Note: Lu Chen's biography in Book of Jin recorded that he died at the age of 67 (by East Asian reckoning) in the 6th year of the Yong'he era of the reign of Emperor Mu of Jin. However, vol.99 of Zizhi Tongjian dated Lu's death to the 3rd month of the 7th year of the Yong'he era; the month corresponds to 13 Apr to 11 May 351 in the Julian calendar.); Lu Mi; Lu Shen
- Parent: Lu Ting (father)
- Courtesy name: Zidao (子道)
- Peerage: Marquis of Wuqiang (武強侯)

Lu Zhi (died c. December 312 or 315), courtesy name Zidao, was a Chinese politician of the Western Jin dynasty, and the Han-Zhao dynasty during the Sixteen Kingdoms period. He was a close confidant of the Prince of Chengdu, Sima Ying; throughout the War of the Eight Princes, Lu Zhi provided Sima Ying with vital advice. Lu was praised by traditional historians for encouraging his prince towards righteous decisions and remaining by his side, even after Sima Ying's fall from power and until his death in 306. After the war, he continued to serve the Jin government until his capture by the Han-Zhao dynasty, where he briefly served before he was executed for treason.

== Background ==
Lu Zhi was a native of Zhuo County, Fanyang Commandery and was the great-grandson of the Han dynasty military general, Lu Zigan. His grandfather, Lu Yu, uncle Lu Qin (盧欽) and father Lu Ting (盧珽; Lu Qin's younger brother), were officials for the Cao Wei dynasty, with the latter two going on to serve under Wei's successor, Western Jin. Early in his career, Lu Zhi served as an official in the government and Prefect of the Masters of Writing before leaving the capital, Luoyang to serve as the Prefect of Ye.

When the Prince of Chengdu, Sima Ying, was assigned to defend Ye, he met with Lu Zhi and was deeply impressed by his talents. The two men trusted each other, and eventually, Lu Zhi became a key advisor for the prince.

== War of the Eight Princes ==
=== Coalition against Sima Lun ===
In February 301, the Prince of Zhao, Sima Lun, usurped the throne from Emperor Hui of Jin. In response, the Prince of Qi, Sima Jiong, began a coalition to depose Lun and urged Sima Ying to join him. Sima Ying consulted Lu Zhi for a strategy, and he opined, "The Prince of Zhao [Sima Lun] is unjust, acting with tyranny and rebellion. He has aroused the anger of the people and spirits within the Four Seas. Currently, Your Highness commands the three armies, and should we react quickly at the right time, the people will flock to you without being summoned. As we will be sweeping away the wicked and treacherous, conquest can be achieved without a battle. However, military affairs are of the utmost importance and therefore should be cautiously handled by the sages. It is best that we appoint and promote talented individuals to win the support and respect of the people." Sima Ying agreed and made Lu Zhi his Consultant Advisor and Chief Clerk of the Left. He was also placed in charge of handling official documents.

As Sima Ying marched to Luoyang, he and his soldiers were met by Sima Lun's army at Huangqiao (黃橋, around present-day Wen County, Henan). Ying's vanguard was badly defeated at first, causing him to consider retreating to defend Zhaoge. However, Lu Zhi insisted that they surprise their enemies by advancing quickly with their best soldiers during the early morning, believing that they had become overconfident from their recent victory. Sima Ying agreed and sent his general, Zhao Xiang (趙驤), with 80,000 to advance with Wang Yan (王彥). As predicted, the enemy commander, Shi Yi (士猗) underestimated their momentum, allowing Ying's forces to win a great victory and cross the Yellow River.

=== Regency of Sima Jiong ===
Before the coalition could arrive, Sima Lun was overthrown and killed in a coup in Luoyang. Sima Ying's forces were the first to arrive at the capital, but as leader of the coalition, Sima Jiong took power as regent following Emperor Hui's restoration. Lu Zhi warned Sima Ying, "The Prince of Qi [Sima Jiong] commanded a million soldiers, yet he could not defeat Zhang Hong (張泓) and the like. Meanwhile, you, Great Prince, crossed the Yellow River and achieved exceptional merits. Now, the Prince of Qi wishes to share power over the court with you. However, it is said that two heroes cannot coexist, and their deeds cannot be equal. Thus, you should cite your mother's illness and request to return to your base. Honour the Prince of Qi and gradually win the support of the people within the Four Seas. This is the best strategy to take."

Sima Ying accepted his suggestion and handed over all major responsibilities to Sima Jiong before returning to Ye. His actions garnered much praise and support from the people. For his contribution in the war, Lu Zhi was awarded the title of Marquis of Wuqiang and promoted to Cavalier in Regular Attendance. While in Ye, Ying entrusted all affairs to Lu Zhi and through his guidance become increasingly popular among the people while Jiong lost favour due to his arrogant personality.

On one occasion, as summer was approaching, Lu Zhi reminded Ying of the more than 8,000 men who were killed at the Battle of Huangqiao. Not wanting the bodies to go to waste, he advised the prince to carry out burials for them, citing King Wen of Zhou who once ordered the burial of the skeletal remains of an unknown person he found in the wild. Ying commissioned for more than 8,000 coffins built and used funds from his fief to acquire clothing. The bodies were buried north of Huangqiao, and a stele was erected to commemorate the soldiers' deeds. Meanwhile, families of the fallen soldiers were honoured and ordered to perform seasonal sacrifices for them. Ying also submitted a petition concerning family matters and posthumously promoted the soldiers by two ranks. Additionally, he had more than 14,000 troops who died fighting for Sima Lun buried in Wen County.

In 302, the Prince of Hejian, Sima Yong, was raising troops to campaign against Sima Jiong and informed Ying about it. Lu Zhi attempted to dissuade Ying from joining the plot, but the prince refused to heed his advice. However, before they could launch their campaign, Jiong was killed in Luoyang by the Prince of Changsha, Sima Ai, and the latter began holding considerable power over the imperial government.

=== Coalition against Sima Ai ===
Unsatisfied with the outcome, Yong and Ying started another coalition in 303, this time to overthrow Sima Ai. Lu Zhi tried again to persuade him from joining, stating, "Lord, previously you had achieved great merits, willingly relinquished your power and refused honours, all which earned you immense respect and admiration. Right now, you should be stationing your armies outside the passes and entering the court in ceremonial robes. This is the act of a hegemon." However, Ying ignored him and proceeded with Sima Yong's forces to lay siege on Sima Ai in Luoyang. After Ai's defeat in 304, Ying returned to Ye and became prime minister. He also appointed Lu Zhi as Chief of the Palace Secretariat, providing him with advice for his duty as prime minister.

=== Sima Ying as Crown Younger Brother ===
Later in 304, Sima Ying was appointed Crown Younger Brother, allowing him to inherit the throne after Emperor Hui dies. Afterwards, he was said to have grown more arrogant and corrupt, losing some support from the people. Soon, the Prince of Donghai, Sima Yue, started a coalition from Luoyang to depose him but was defeated. Emperor Hui, who was following Sima Yue's forces, was captured by Ying's men, so the prince sent Lu Zhi to escort him to Ye.

Not long after, the Chief Controller of Youzhou, Wang Jun, and the Inspector of Bingzhou, Sima Teng, also started their campaign against Ying. Wang Jun was victorious in every bout on the way to Ye, and when he reached the city, many of Ying's officials, generals and soldiers fled. Lu Zhi urged the prince to fall back to Luoyang with Emperor Hui, and he agreed. However, Ying's mother, Grand Consort Cheng (程太妃), was fond of the city and refused to leave, causing Ying to hesitate with his decision. Soon, many of the remaining soldiers also fled, leaving only Lu Zhi, his son Lu Mi (盧謐), his nephew Lu Chen (盧綝) and a thousand palace troops.

Lu Zhi urged Ying to carry out the plan, but it was only after the departure Taoist diviner surnamed Huang (黃), whom the Grand Consort deeply trusted, that they could finally leave. With no horses and porters, Lu Zhi had to acquire ropes and deer carts from the barracks to escape on calf-drawn carts. On the way to Luoyang, Ying's party was joined by the general, Hao Chang (郝昌), and his soldiers at Ji Commandery (汲郡; around present-day Weihui, Henan). With the party rejuvenated, Lu Zhi suggested to Emperor Hui that he issue a letter of amnesty so that the emperor would be received and assisted by the common people. The party reached Luoyang, where they were placed under the authority of Sima Yong's general, Zhang Fang. Lu Zhi recommended that Man Fen (滿奮) be appointed the Colonel-Director of Retainers as many of Ying's followers who had fled earlier returned to restore some function to the government. Emperor Hui was pleased and greatly rewarded Lu Zhi.

As Zhang Fang controlled the military in Luoyang, he dominated Emperor Hui and Sima Ying was powerless to stop him. After staying at the capital for so long, Zhang Fang's men were becoming restless and planned to move the emperor to Yong's base in Chang'an. In December 304, Zhang Fang ordered Emperor Hui out of the city to stay at the ramparts. The emperor was reluctant at first, but Lu Zhi persuaded him to follow Zhang Fang's command. At this point, many of the ministers had fled and gone into hiding, but only Lu Zhi stayed by the emperor's side. While Emperor Hui was away, Zhang Fang's men began pillaging Luoyang. Zhang Fang even planned to burn down the Ancestral Temple, but Lu Zhi intervened and said, "In the past, Dong Zhuo was a tyrant who burned down Luoyang, and the resentment towards him has lasted for a hundred years. Why would you want to imitate that?" Thus, Zhang Fang decided against it. After three days, Zhang Fang brought Emperor Hui to Chang'an, and Lu Zhi followed them. There, Sima Ying was demoted from his position as Crown Younger Prince, while Lu Zhi was stripped of his position.

=== After Sima Ying's removal ===
In 305, using the pretext of the emperor's forced relocation to Chang'an, Sima Yue began a coalition against Sima Yong. At the same time, a general of Sima Ying, Gongshi Fan, also rebelled in Hebei in protest of the prince's removal from power. Faced with multiple threats from the east, Sima Yong assigned Ying to Ye to appease Gongshi Fan's rebels. Lu Zhi was also brought back as Administrator of Wei Commandery and then promoted to General of the Left to follow Ying to his post. However, after the two left for Ye, they were blocked by the Duke of Pingchang, Sima Mo's forces at Luoyang, so they returned to Chang'an.

Before they could arrive, there were news that Sima Yong was suing for peace with Sima Yue, so Ying went to Huayin (華陰; in modern Weinan, Shaanxi) instead. Lu Zhi continued to Chang'an, where he explained his actions and apologized to the court before returning to Ying at Wuguan. From Wuguan, they fled to Nanyang but were attacked by the general, Liu Tao (劉陶), so they planned to go to Hebei to join Gongshi Fan. However, Ying was caught and placed under house arrest by the Prince of Fanyang, Sima Xiao in Ye. After Xiao died at the end of 306, his Chief Clerk, Liu Yu, had Ying killed during the night. By the time of Ying's death, all of his subordinates had already left him, but Lu Zhi remained with him until the end. He personally carried out the prince's funeral and subsequently became a subject of praise at the time.

== Final years and death ==
After the death of Sima Ying, Lu Zhi was appointed by Sima Yue as an Army Libationer-Consultant. He was then transferred to Commandant of the Guards, and by 311, he was serving as the Master of Writing.

In 311, Luoyang fell to Han-Zhao forces and Emperor Huai of Jin was captured in an event known as the Disaster of Yongjia. Lu Zhi brought his wife and sons north to join the Inspector of Bingzhou, Liu Kun, who was resisting the growing Han threat. However, they were captured by Han forces at Yangyi (陽邑; in present-day Handan, Hebei) and sent to the Han capital, Pingyang. There are two accounts of Lu Zhi's death. According to the entry of his eldest son, Lu Chen (盧諶; note the different character from his cousin) in the Book of Jin, after Liu Kun recaptured his base, Jinyang in 312, Lu Chen fled Han to join him. As a result, Lu Zhi and his two other sons, Lu Mi and Lu Shen (盧詵), were executed.

The second account comes from the biography of the Han emperor, Liu Cong in the Book of Jin. After his capture, Lu Zhi was appointed by Liu Cong as the Grand Instructor of the Crown Yonger Brother, Liu Ai (劉乂). In 315, (Note: 1st year of the Jian'yuan era of Liu Cong's reign) Lu Zhi and his fellow former Jin officials, Xu Xia (許遐) and Cui Wei (崔瑋), plotted to get Liu Ai to rebel against Liu Cong. Liu Ai was losing favour as he was constantly slandered by Liu Cong's eldest son, Liu Can and his supporters, but he refused to go along with the conspirators' plans. After the official, Xun Yu (荀裕), revealed their plot, Lu Zhi, Xu Xia and Cui Wei were arrested, interrogated and executed. (Note: In vol.89 of Zizhi Tongjian, the record for this incident only mentioned Cui Wei and Xu Xia. In Zizhi Tongjian Kaoyi, Sima Guang voiced his opinion that based on Lu Zhi advising Sima Ying to rise up against Sima Lun, and him advising Ying not to attack Sima Ai, Lu was an upright person and thus not someone who would advise others to rebel.)

== Anecdotes ==
Once, in public, Lu Zhi asked the Lu brothers (Lu Ji and Lu Yun), "How are Lu Xun and Lu Kang related to you?" Lu Ji replied, "Just like how Lu Yu and Lu Ting are related to you." Lu Yun went pale upon hearing his elder brother's reply. Once they left Lu Zhi's presence, Lu Yun said to Lu Ji, "Was that really necessary? Maybe he has not heard about them (their grandfather and father)?" Lu Ji replied sternly, "Our grandfather's and father's fame has spread far and wide; how could he have not heard of them?" (Note: Lu Ji's biography in Book of Jin also recorded this incident, but with slightly different details from the account in Shishuo Xinyu. Lu Ji was angered by the fact that Lu Zhi addressed his elders directly using their given names ("ming"), which was a sign of disrespect.)

Later, when they were both working under Sima Ying, Lu Zhi, fearing that Lu Ji would gain favour with Sima Ying, advised his master, "Lu Ji compares himself to Guan Zhong and Yue Yi; he is implying that you are an incompetent master. Since ancient times, when appointing generals to lead expeditions, there has never been a subordinate who has been insolent to his master and still able to help matters."

After Lu Ji and Lu Yun were arrested by Sima Ying following Ji's defeat to Sima Ai, some officials petitioned Sima Ying to spare Lu Yun; Lu Zhi reminded Sima Ying that when Empress Yang Yan's maternal uncle Zhao Jun was killed by Sima Lun, his son Zhao Xiang was spared. However, Zhao Xiang later joined Sima Ying and attacked Sima Lun.
