= Sima Chong =

Sima Chong 司馬冲

Prince of Donghai (东海王)
- Tenure: c.322 (Note: The chronology of Sima Chong's biography in Book of Jin imply that Sima Chong was made Prince of Donghai around the Yong'chang era (322-323) of his father's reign. The Zizhi Tongjian recorded Wang Dun mentioning the Prince of Donghai and Princess Pei in 324; this Prince of Donghai must have been Sima Chong.) – 28 August 341
- Successor: Sima Yi (司馬奕) (Note: The later Emperor Fei was a grandnephew of Sima Chong as his grandfather Emperor Ming was a half-brother of Sima Chong.)
- Born: 311
- Died: 28 August 341
- Issue: None
- House: Jin dynasty
- Father: Emperor Yuan of Jin

Sima Chong (司馬冲) (311 - 28 August 341), courtesy name Daorang (道让), posthumously known as Prince Ai of Donghai, was an Eastern Jin imperial prince. He was a son of Emperor Yuan of Jin; Emperor Yuan allowed him to be posthumously adopted as the heir of Sima Yue, Prince Xiaoxian of Donghai, a regent for Emperor Hui and Emperor Huai.

== Life ==
Sima Chong was born in 311; his father Sima Rui was then the Prince of Langye, stationed at Jianye since Sima Yue issued an order on 25 August 307, at the suggestion of Sima Yue's wife Princess Pei, for Rui to do so. Sima Chong's mother was Lady Shi, a concubine who was later granted the rank of jieyu after Sima Rui's ascension.

The year of Sima Chong's birth was a tumultuous time for the Western Jin court. In April, Sima Yue, then the regent for Emperor Huai, died of illness near Xuchang, and the imperial army under him was annihilated by Han forces the following month; Sima Yue's sons were all captured and presumably killed by Han general Shi Le. Only Princess Pei fled, and after much suffering, including a stint where she was enslaved, she arrived in Jianye during the Tai'xing era (318-321). In July 311, Emperor Huai was captured by Han after the fall of the capital Luoyang in the Disaster of Yongjia.

By the time Princess Pei reached Jianye, Sima Rui had already claimed the imperial throne. (Note: Sima Rui claimed the imperial throne on 26 April 318.) As emperor, Sima Rui was grateful to Princess Pei for having persuaded Sima Yue to let him have the Jianye post, and he allowed her to adopt Sima Chong to serve as Sima Yue's heir.

As Prince of Donghai, Sima Chong held some positions in the Eastern Jin court during the reign of his nephew Emperor Cheng of Jin, but was not recorded to have any significant achievements in these posts. (Note: During his tenure as Prince of Donghai, Emperor Ming's brother-in-law Yu Shuyu served under Sima Chong in some roles.) He died without issue in August 341, during Emperor Cheng's reign.
