= Sima Yue =

Western Jin Prince Xiaoxian of Donghai (died 311)

- 司馬越

Regent of the Jin dynasty
- In office 307 – 23 April 311
- Monarch: Emperor Hui Emperor Huai

Personal details
- Born: c.260 or before (Note: Sima Yue's biography in Book of Jin recorded that his first position was a teacher of the classics to Emperor Hui while the latter was crown prince (from early 267 to May 290). As such, his birth year should be c.260 or before.)
- Died: 23 April 311
- Parents: Sima Tai (father); Lady Yang (mother)

Prince of Donghai (東海王)
- Tenure: 30 September 291 – 23 April 311
- Successor: Sima Chong
Posthumous name
- Prince Xiaoxian of Donghai (東海孝獻王)
- House: Jin dynasty

Sima Yue (司馬越) (died 23 April 311), courtesy name Yuanchao (元超), formally Prince Xiaoxian of Donghai (東海孝獻王), was a Western Jin imperial prince and regent for Emperor Hui and Emperor Huai. He was the last of eight princes commonly associated with the War of the Eight Princes.

A distant relative of Emperor Hui of Jin, Sima Yue entered the conflict after he betrayed the Prince of Changsha, Sima Ai, taking the emperor for himself and waging war against the Prince of Chengdu, Sima Ying and the Prince of Hejian, Sima Yong. By late 306, he was victorious and established himself as paramount authority behind Emperor Hui and then Emperor Huai of Jin. However, due to the repercussions of the civil wars, he presided over an empire rife with rebellions and famines. Sima Yue controlled Emperor Huai and his court with an iron fist while he campaigned for many years against the Han-Zhao dynasty and their rebel allies, but in 311, he became overwhelmed with stress after Emperor Huai's plot to depose him came to light. He soon died of illness, and without his leadership, Han forces annihilated the Jin imperial army before sacking the capital Luoyang and capturing Emperor Huai in the Disaster of Yongjia.

== Background and early career ==
Sima Yue was the eldest son (Note: While Sima Yue's biography in Book of Jin recorded that he was the second son (次子), Sima Tai's biography in the same work listed him as the eldest. As Yue was also heir to the Princedom of Longxi before he was made Prince of Donghai, it was more likely that he was the eldest son. Another possibility was that he had an elder brother who died young.) of Sima Tai (司馬泰; posthumously known as Prince Wenxian of Gaomi (高密文献王) (Note: Emperor Hui's biography in Book of Jin erroneously recorded Sima Tai's title as "Prince of Longxi" when he died in 299. It is unknown when exactly Tai's title was changed from "Prince of Longxi" to "Prince of Gaomi", but it should be between 296 and 299. After Sima Tai's death, his third son Sima Lüe was the next Prince of Gaomi.)), who was a son of Sima Yi's brother Sima Kui (司馬馗), making Yue a second cousin of Jin's founding emperor Emperor Wu. Sima Yue's mother, a Lady Yang, was a grand-daughter of the Wei official Yang Jun (杨俊). (Note: The Wei Jin Shiyu recorded that Yang Jun's grandson Yang Yi was a maternal uncle of Sima Yue. Yang Jun himself was on good terms with Sima Yi; Sima Yi tried but failed to save Yang after the latter offended Wei emperor Cao Pi in 222 (Yang committed suicide).) In February 266, after Emperor Wu established the Jin dynasty, Sima Tai was named Prince of Longxi on 9 February. As the eldest son, Yue's first title was "Heir to the Princedom of Longxi" (陇西世子). It was in this capacity that he was made a teacher who taught the classics to the crown prince Sima Zhong; other such teachers include Yang Miao (杨邈) and Sima Yao (司马繇), son of Sima Zhou. His wife Lady Pei was a younger sister of Pei Dun, son of Pei Kang, elder brother of Pei Kai; Pei Kang was an ancestor of the historians Pei Songzhi and Pei Ziye.

Sima Yue also took part in Jia Nanfeng's coup against Emperor Hui's first regent Yang Jun, and was made a marquis, with a fiefdom of 5000 households. On 30 September 291, he was created the Prince of Donghai. During the early parts of the War of the Eight Princes, he held a number of offices in the capital Luoyang.

In early 304, when the regent Sima Ai the Prince of Changsha (Emperor Hui's half-brother) was battling the forces of Sima Ying the Prince of Chengdu (also Emperor Hui's half-brother) and Sima Yong the Prince of Hejian (grandson of Emperor Hui's great-granduncle Sima Fu, Prince Xian of Anping [安平献王]), even though Sima Ai was fighting off the overwhelming force that Sima Ying and Sima Yong had, Sima Yue became convinced that a victory was impossible, and he seized Sima Ai and delivered him to Sima Yong's general Zhang Fang, who executed Sima Ai cruelly by burning him to death. Sima Ying controlled the government remotely, with Sima Yue being one of the generals who stayed in Luoyang to execute Sima Ying's orders.

== Campaigns against Sima Ying and Sima Yong ==
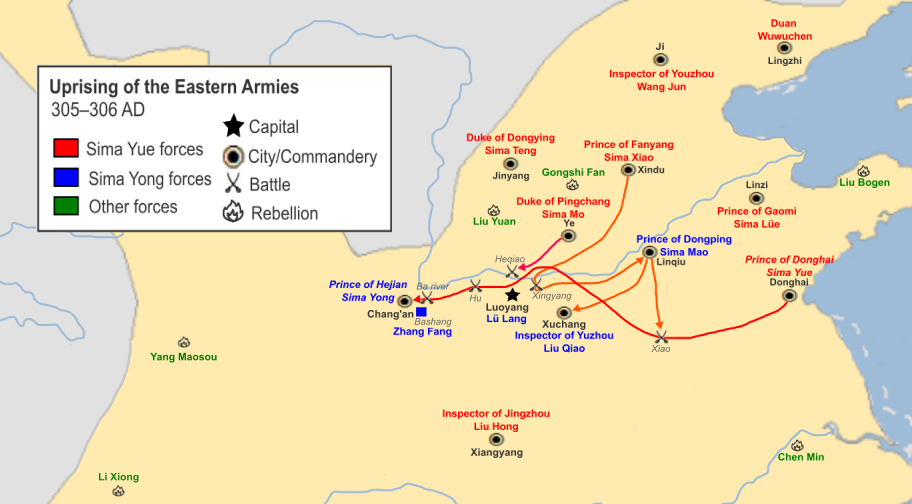
Uprising of the Eastern Armies, 305–306 AD.

As Sima Ying continued to remotely control the government from his stronghold of Yecheng (鄴城, in modern Handan, Hebei) as both regent and crown prince, the officials in Luoyang tired of the situation. Later in 304, Sima Yue led them in a rebellion against Sima Ying's forces, and he took Emperor Hui with him on the campaign. After some initial hesitation, Sima Ying fought and defeated Sima Yue's forces, forcing Sima Yue to flee. Emperor Hui was captured and taken to Yecheng. Subsequently, however, Sima Ying was defeated by Wang Jun, the commander of the forces of You Province (幽州, modern Beijing, Tianjin, and northern Hebei) and fled to Luoyang without his troops. Sima Yong then seized control of the government and Emperor Hui, deposing Sima Ying from his position as crown prince in February 305 and replacing him with another half-brother of Emperor Hui's, Sima Chi the Prince of Yuzhang. Later, Yong further had Zhang forcibly move Emperor Hui and Crown Prince Chi to Chang'an, under his firm control.

Sima Yue decided to act against Sima Yong. In fall 305, he declared a rebellion with the stated intention of returning Emperor Hui to Luoyang. The warlords of the empire were forced to take sides, but eventually they generally fell into line behind Sima Yue because they were disgusted with Zhang's cruelty. The battles were initially largely indecisive, but in early 306, after Sima Yue had some minor victories over Sima Yong's forces, Sima Yong panicked and killed Zhang, seeking peace with Sima Yue. Sima Yue refused, and by later that year was able to force Sima Yong to abandon both Emperor Hui and Chang'an. Sima Yue welcomed Emperor Hui back to the capital Luoyang in June. In January 307, Emperor Hui was poisoned to death, and historians generally agreed that the poisoning was done at Sima Yue's orders, but the motive was unclear. (Note: One possible motive could be that Sima Yue regarded Emperor Hui as a jinx, for each of his previous regents (besides Sima Yong) had died unnatural deaths. After Emperor Hui's death, Sima Yong was also tricked into surrendering himself and killed by a general under Sima Mo, Yue's brother.) Crown Prince Chi ascended to the throne as Emperor Huai.

== Domination over Emperor Huai ==
Emperor Huai, in contrast with the developmentally disabled Emperor Hui, was intelligent and astute, and he sought to revive the war-ravaged empire, but Sima Yue maintained a tight grip on authority and would not allow the emperor much actual power. On 18 May 307, he left Luoyang and set up headquarters at Xuchang (許昌, in modern Xuchang, Henan), but continued to control the government remotely. He also gave his younger brothers various titles and military appointments. Sima Teng, the second brother, was appointed Prince of Xincai, and was made Chief Controller of Si and Ji Provinces, while being garrisoned at Ye. Sima Lüe, the third brother, was made General who Attacks the South, Chief Controller of Jing Province and was garrisoned at Xiangyang. Sima Mo, the youngest brother, was appointed Grand General who Conquers the West and Chief Controller of Qin, Yong, Liáng and Yi provinces. He was garrisoned at Chang'an. Later that year, on 25 August, at the urging of his wife Princess Pei, he issued an order that appeared insignificant at the time but would turn out to be important later on—making Sima Rui the Prince of Langye in charge of Yang Province (揚州, modern Zhejiang and southern Jiangsu and Anhui), at the post of Jianye (建業, in modern Nanjing, Jiangsu); this was the post from which Sima Rui would later, after the fall of Luoyang and Chang'an to Han-Zhao, claim the Jin imperial title. (Note: Nearly three years later, in June or July 310, Princess Pei's brother Pei Chun would also flee to Jianye.)

Despite his suspicion of Emperor Huai, Sima Yue was still willing to keep him on the throne. He strongly rejected attempts to have the emperor replaced with the teenage Sima Tan, (Note: Sima Tan's maternal grandmother Lady Sima was a paternal aunt of Sima Yue; Lady Sima's son Zhou Mu was Sima Tan's maternal uncle, per vol.86 of Zizhi Tongjian and vol.59 of Jin Shu.) Emperor Hui's nephew and initial Crown Prince after his direct male descendants had all died, perhaps intending to control an emperor with slightly more agency than the previous one. On 24 March 308, a few months after foiling a conspiracy to install Sima Tan to the throne, Sima Yue ordered the former crown prince to be killed.

In 309, Sima Yue, concerned about the growing use of authority that Emperor Huai was exerting, made a sudden return to Luoyang and arrested and executed a number of Emperor Huai's associates, including Emperor Huai's uncle Wang Yan (王延). Other than privately mourning them, there was nothing that Emperor Huai could do. Sima Yue further disbanded the imperial guards and put his own personal forces in charge of protecting the emperor.

For all of Sima Yue's assertion of authority, he could not stop Han-Zhao, under its generals Liu Cong the Prince of Chu (the son of Han's emperor Liu Yuan), Liu Yao the Prince of Shi'an (Liu Yuan's nephew), Wang Mi, and Shi Le, from disrupting Jin rule throughout northern and central China and capturing Jin cities and towns. Sima Teng was killed by rebels in Ye, while Mo, Lüe and Rui were not as cooperative as Yue had expected them to be, being more interested in consolidating their own territories. Yue and his allies were able to defeat Han on numerous occasions, such as in late 309, when he managed to fight off a joint attack by Liu Cong and Wang on Luoyang, but their forces were gradually worn out while rebel groups in the north continued to attach themselves to the Han.

After Liu Yuan died in 310 and was succeeded by Liu Cong, Han renewed its attacks on the Luoyang region. Meanwhile, Sima Yue continued to alienate other generals and officials, and when Liu Kun, the military commander of Bing (并州, roughly modern Shanxi) proposed to him the plan of an attack on the Han capital Pingyang (平陽, in modern Linfen, Shanxi) in conjunction with the powerful Xianbei chieftain Tuoba Yilu the Duke of Dai, Sima Yue was fearful of backstabbing attack by some of these warlords and therefore unable to accept Liu's plan. Indeed, when Emperor Huai and Sima Yue sent out calls for the various governors to come to Luoyang's aid later that year, there were few responses. Sima Yue became uncertain of himself, and late in 310 left Luoyang with virtually all of the central government's remaining troops, along with a large number of officials, effectively stripping Luoyang and Emperor Huai bare of their defenses, except for a small detachment commanded by Sima Yue's subordinate He Lun (何倫), intended as much to monitor as to protect Emperor Huai. From that point on, Luoyang was left even without a police force and became largely a city abandoned to bandits and thugs.

Emperor Huai soon entered into a plan with Gou Xi, the military commander of Qing Province (青州, modern central and eastern Shandong), who had been dissatisfied with Sima Yue, to overthrow Sima Yue's yoke. Sima Yue discovered this plan, but was unable to wage a campaign against Gou. He grew ill in his anger and distress, and died in April 311.

== Postmortem developments ==
The generals and officials in Sima Yue's army, led by Wang Yan, instead of returning to Luoyang, headed east toward Yue's principality of Donghai (roughly modern Linyi, Shandong) to bury him there. He Lun, upon hearing about Sima Yue's death, also withdrew from Luoyang and sought to join that force. However, both were intercepted by Shi Le and wiped out. Shi, declaring that Sima Yue had caused the empire much damage, burned Sima Yue's body. Sima Yue's sons were all captured and presumably killed by Shi. Only Princess Pei fled, and after much suffering, including a stint where she was enslaved, she arrived in Jianye during the Tai'xing era (318-321). Because she had persuaded Sima Yue to let Sima Rui have the Jianye post, Sima Rui was grateful to her and honored both her and Sima Yue posthumously, and allowed her to adopt his son Sima Chong (司馬沖; 311 - 28 August 341) to serve as Sima Yue's heir. None of Yue's immediate relations went to the south; his cousin Sima Zhi's (司马植; Prince Yuan of Pengcheng) grandson Sima Xiong (司马雄; Prince of Pengcheng) was the only descendant of Sima Kui to reach Jiankang. (Note: Per the Book of Jin (in volumes 6 and 28), during the Tai'an era (302 - 303) of Emperor Hui's reign, a nursery rhyme went "Five horses swarm across the river; one horse turned into a loong". Of the five imperial princes which converged at Jiankang, three had direct relations: Sima Yang (Prince of Xiyang), his brother Sima Zong (Prince of Nandun), and their nephew Sima You (Prince of Ru'nan and son of their elder brother Sima Ju). Of the five, four were descendants of Sima Yi.)

As for his brothers-in-law (Princess Pei's brothers), Pei Dun was killed about a month after Sima Yue's death, when Xuzhou fell. About a year earlier, Pei Chun, then Administrator of Xingyang, had fled to Jianye. Luoyang itself would fall to Han-Zhao forces in July, in the Disaster of Yongjia.
