= Zhang Fang =

Jin dynasty general (died 306)

- 張方

General of Inspiring Martial Might (振武將軍)
- In office ?–?
- Monarch: Emperor Hui of Jin

General Who Leads The Army of the Center (中領軍)
- In office 304–306
- Monarch: Emperor Hui of Jin

Personal details
- Born: Unknown Cangzhou, Hebei
- Died: c.February 306
- Children: Zhang Pi

Zhang Fang (died c. February 306) was a military general of the Jin dynasty (266–420). He was the influential general of the Prince of Hejian, Sima Yong during the War of the Eight Princes who helped him in subduing the Prince of Changshan, Sima Ai, and had the imperial family briefly under his control in 304. Though capable, he was infamous for his transgressions against the emperor and the cruelty that he and his soldiers displayed, with one account claiming that he had them engage in cannibalism. His act of forcibly moving Emperor Hui of Jin from Luoyang to Chang'an provided the Prince of Donghai, Sima Yue and his allies with pretext to start a coalition to punish him and Sima Yong in 305. In a desperate attempt to settle for peace, Sima Yong had Zhang Fang assassinated the following year.

== Life ==
=== Coalition against Sima Lun and Sima Jiong (301 and 302) ===
Zhang Fang was born in a poor family in Sima Yong's princely fief, Hejian commandery. Despite his upbringing, he was talented and brave enough to capture the attention of the prince, who employed him into his administration. He soon climbed through the ranks and became his General of Inspiring Martial Might by 301. That same year, Zhang Fang captured Xiahou Shi (夏侯奭), a former Army Advisor who was raising an army in Shiping (始平, in modern Xingping, Shaanxi) to join the anti-Sima Lun coalition. Sima Yong initially sided with Sima Lun, who had usurped the throne earlier that year, and sent Zhang Fang to reinforce him in Luoyang. However, after learning that the Sima Ying and Sima Jiong forces were larger in size, Yong decided to switch sides and recalled Zhang Fang.

Zhang Fang was involved in Sima Yong and Sima Ying's coalition against Sima Jiong (now Emperor Hui of Jin's regent) in 302. He led Yong's vanguard towards Luoyang and occupied Xin'an. There, in accordance with Yong's strategy, he proclaimed that the Prince of Changshan, Sima Ai, who was in Luoyang, should take action and punish Sima Jiong. The intent was to make Ai complicit in the two princes' rebellion so that Jiong would execute him first before they attack the capital, thus eliminating a potential political rival. However, the plan did not go as expected, as Ai managed to fight back and kill Jiong, taking over the imperial court.

=== Siege of Luoyang (303–304) ===
Yong was not satisfied with the outcome, so he had another coalition with Sima Ying against Sima Ai in 303. Sima Ying and Zhang Fang jointly attacked Luoyang and placed the capital under siege with Sima Ai and the emperor still inside. Ai sent his general Huangfu Shang to stop Zhang's advances, but he was defeated in a surprise attack. Zhang's soldiers breached through the walls and carried out mass plunderings and killings. Ai personally went out to lead the army against Zhang Fang at Ximing Gate (西明門; the southmost end of Luoyang's western wall), bringing along the emperor with him. Sighting the imperial carriage, Zhang Fang did not dare to attack and instead retreated. Sima Ai capitalized on this and dealt Zhang Fang a major setback.

Zhang Fang managed to return to his camp, where his men were starting to believe that they should retreat during the night. However, Zhang Fang did not think so, and instead ordered them to build a rampart surrounding Luoyang. The rampart was built in secrecy and Sima Ai himself thought that Zhang Fang was still recovering from his defeat. Once the rampart was completed, Sima Ai was taken by surprise and attacked him but failed. Meanwhile, Zhang Fang breached the Qianjin Dam (千金堨) and dried up the water mills around the capital. He had slave women from noble families to grind up food for his men and implemented forced labour indiscriminately as a punishment for those who he found were not partaking in the campaign hard enough.

Despite the advantages, the siege carried on into the following year in 304. Sima Ai was finding success in battles against Sima Ying and his men's morale continued to soar. Zhang figured that Luoyang was not ready to fall and decided to retreat. However, just as he did, the Prince of Donghai, Sima Yue, had Sima Ai arrested, fearing that he would not be able to overcome Sima Ying and Sima Yong in the long run. Yue arranged to hand over Sima Ai to Zhang Fang at Jinyong Fortress (金墉城). Once he received the captured prince, Zhang Fang had him burnt alive in front of Zhang's own army.

While the siege of Luoyang was going on, Sima Yong was defending Chang'an from his former general, Liu Chen, who had rebelled against him in 303. After Liu Chen defeated Sima Yong's general, Yu Kui (虞夔), Yong urged Zhang Fang to return and help him. Zhang Fang plundered Luoyang and took in more than ten thousand slave women into his army before departing. The Zizhi Tongjian further claims that, to keep his army supplied, he also had people killed and mixed their flesh with beef and horse meat. After reaching near Chang'an, he sent his general Dun Wei (敦偉) to attack Liu Chen during the night. Liu was captured and subsequently executed by Sima Yong.

=== Controlling the imperial family (304–305) ===
In 304, Sima Yue raised a coalition against Sima Ying from Luoyang, bringing Emperor Hui with him. Yue's coalition was defeated and the emperor was captured, but Ying was subsequently attacked by the Inspector of Youzhou, Wang Jun and the Inspector of Bingzhou, Sima Teng. Sima Yong ordered Zhang Fang to rescue Ying, but after hearing that the Emperor Hui had retreated into Ye, Yong had him guard Luoyang instead. The generals within Luoyang, Shangguan Si (上官巳) and Miao Yuan (苗願) retaliated against Zhang Fang but were defeated. The Crown Prince, Sima Tan, ousted them out from the capital and welcomed Zhang Fang. Despite the warm reception, Zhang had Sima Tan deposed along with the empress, Yang Xianrong. Wang Jun decisively defeated Sima Ying at Ye, and he barely escaped with his remaining officials before making his way towards Luoyang. As they nearly reached Luoyang, Zhang Fang sent his son Zhang Pi (張羆) to escort them into the city. Zhang welcomed him with his cavalries and performed obeisance to the point that the emperor personally approached him to get him to stop.

With the emperor in Luoyang and Sima Ying powerless, Zhang had full control over the imperial family. He wanted to move the emperor to Chang'an and make the city the new capital seeing that his men were becoming restless staying in Luoyang. However, he knew that many of the ministers were wary of him, and initially tried to get the emperor to go to the Ancestral Temple, so he could move him by force with his soldiers but the emperor refused. His patience eventually wore off, so he had his men storm the palace and drag the emperor into the imperial carriage. He justified to the emperor that he only wanted him to inspect the ramparts he had built years ago to ensure that the defenses are proper.

Meanwhile, while the emperor was at the rampart, Zhang Fang's soldiers raided the palace and looted the place until there was nothing left to steal. Zhang then considered burning down the palace and Ancestral Temple to prevent anyone else from entering but forfeited the decision after his contemporary, Lu Zhi, compared his actions to Dong Zhuo. The emperor remained at the rampart for three days before Zhang forced him and his family to relocate to Chang'an. After they were moved, Sima Yong appointed Zhang as General Who Leads The Army of the center, chief of affairs of the Masters of Writing, and acting Administrator of Jingzhao. In 305, Zhang deposed Yang Xianrong once again.

=== Downfall and death (305–306) ===
Zhang Fang's treatment of the emperor created scorn among the people and officials. The same year in 305, Huangfu Chang (皇甫昌), the nephew of Huangfu Shang, forged an edict under the guise of Sima Yue and the now-deposed Yang Xianrong's orders asking officials to attack Zhang Fang and save the emperor in Chang'an. The edict was believed at first but Huangfu Chang's forgery was soon found out, and he was put to death. Later on, Sima Yue's official, Liu Qia (劉洽) urged his prince to raise a coalition against Sima Yong, seeing that Zhang Fang had forcibly moved the emperor to Chang'an. Yue carried out the last coalition of the civil war against Sima Yong, and Yong had Zhang Fang made Grand Commander to march to Xuchang and fight them. Despite Sima Yong's orders, Zhang Fang refused to move his army.

In 306, Sima Yong was considering peace after being advised by a henchman of his, Mou Bo (繆播). However, Zhang Fang greatly opposed it, ostensibly pointing out Yong's advantages when in reality, he knew that peace would result in his execution for his crimes. Yong continued the war, even after his crucial ally Liu Qiao was defeated by Sima Xiao's general, Liu Kun. Yong's Army Advisor, Bi Yuan (畢垣), who had suffered from Zhang Fang's cruelty and seeing him lose favour, accused Zhang of plotting to overthrow the prince, citing his refusal to move against the coalition. Mou Bo and Mou Yin (繆胤) also agreed and pushed Yong to execute him.

Sima Yong summoned an old friend of Zhang Fang named Zhi Fu (郅輔) who he sent to assassinate the general. When Zhi Fu arrived at his camp, he was allowed to bring his sword into the tent due to their relationship. Zhi Fu presented him with a letter from Yong, which he immediately opened to read. With his guard down, Zhi Fu killed him and beheaded his corpse. Yong sent his head to Sima Yue, hoping this would encourage him to settle with peace. The proposal was rejected, and Liu Kun used his head to convince Yong's other general to surrender to the coalition.
