= Sima Lun =

Prince of Zhao and Jin dynasty usurper (died 301)

- Pavilion-Marquess of Anle (安樂亭侯); Viscount Dong'an (東安子)
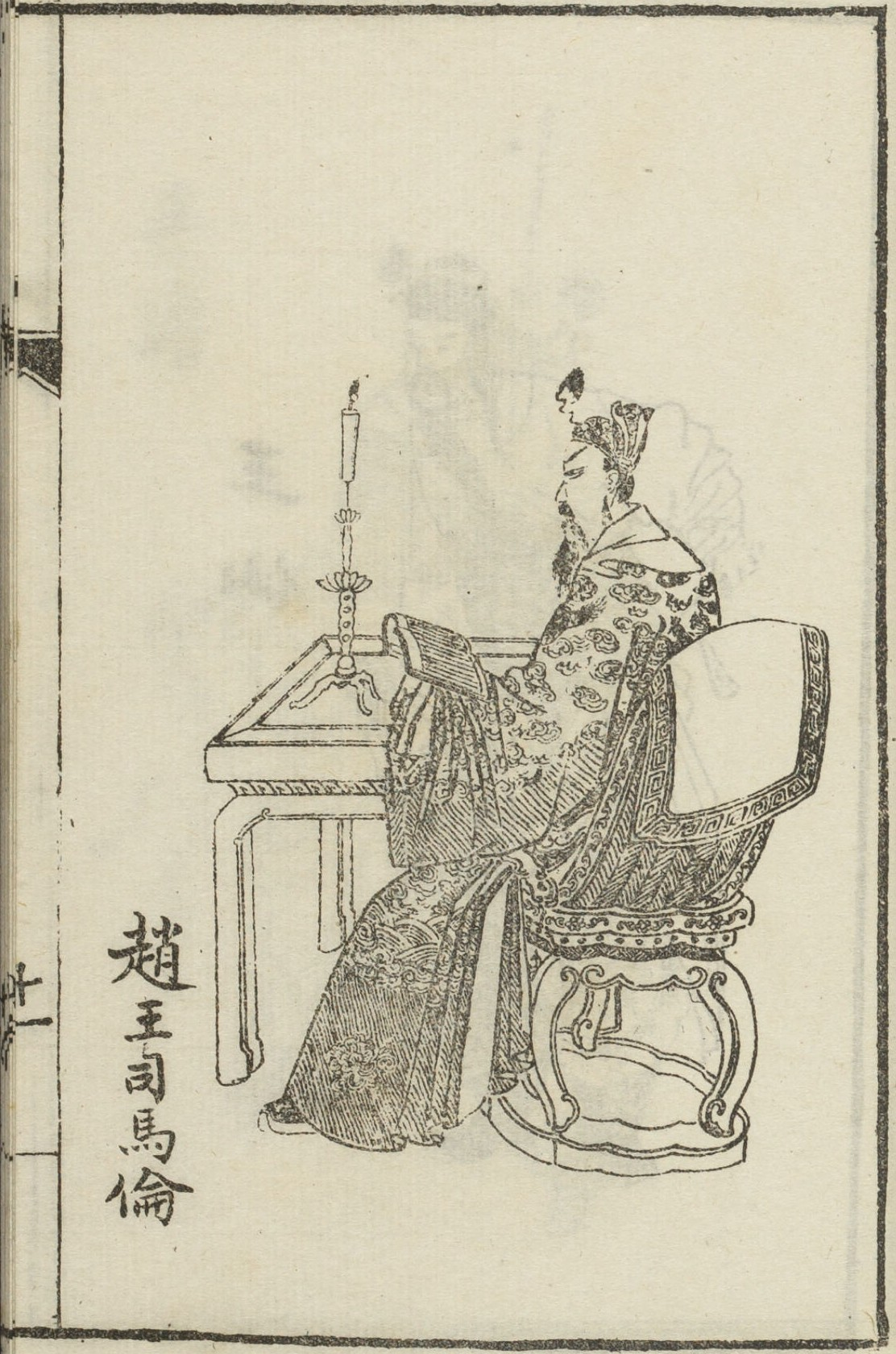

Emperor of the Jin dynasty
- Reign: 3 February – 31 May 301
- Predecessor: Emperor Hui
- Successor: Emperor Hui

Prince of Zhao (趙王)
- Tenure: 5 October 277 – 3 February 301

Prince of Langye Commandery (琅邪郡王)
- Tenure: 9 February 266 – 5 October 277
- Born: between 232 and 249
- Died: June 5, 301 (aged between 52 and 69)
- Issue: Sima Fū (司馬荂); Sima Fù (司馬馥); Sima Qián (司馬虔); Sima Xǔ (司馬詡)
Names
- Family name: Sīmǎ (司馬); Given name: Lún (倫)
Era dates
- Jiànshǐ (建始) (3 February - 31 May 301
- House: Jin
- Father: Sima Yi
- Mother: Lady Bai (Note: Historical records have very little to say on Lady Bai. She was a concubine of Sima Yi, and he doted on her to the extent of neglecting his main wife, Zhang Chunhua. She did not receive any title, even after her son Sima Lun became emperor. The Book of Jin also recorded a piece of advice Sima Gan (a full brother of Sima Shi and Sima Zhao) gave to Sima Jiong after Jiong became regent, that he "should not emulate that child of Lady Bai's". The Jin Shu implied that Gan advised Jiong not to crown himself emperor, with Lun as the cautionary example.) (Note: The Book of Jin by Zhu Feng recorded that Sima Lun's mother was Lady Huan.)

Sima Lun (traditional Chinese: 司馬倫; simplified Chinese: 司马伦; pinyin: Sīmǎ Lún; Wade–Giles: Ssu-ma Lun) (born before 250 (Note: While Sima Lun's birth year was not recorded, he was younger than his half-brothers Sima Gan and Sima Jun, who were born in 232.) – poisoned 5 June 301), courtesy name Ziyi (子彛), was titled the Prince of Zhao (趙王; 赵王; Zhào Wáng) and the usurper of the Jin dynasty from 3 February to 31 May 301. He is usually not counted in the list of Jin emperors due to his brief reign and was often mentioned by historians as a usurper. He was the third of the eight princes commonly associated with the War of the Eight Princes.

A son of Sima Yi, Sima Lun was arguably the most reviled and hated among the Eight Princes. His tenure as governor in the Guanzhong region ended in a large-scale rebellion by the local tribes which forced him to be recalled back to the capital, Luoyang in 296. Back in the capital, he became a confidant of Empress Jia and her family, who ruled the empire behind the throne of her husband and Sima Lun's grandnephew, Emperor Hui. As she lost support due to her controversial removal of the Crown Prince, Sima Yu, Sima Lun led a coup to depose her and installed himself as the emperor's new regent. Sima Lun, with the help of his advisor, Sun Xiu had all his court rivals brutally purged and eventually compelled Emperor Hui to abdicate the throne to him in 301. His usurpation was immediately denounced, and just a few months later, he was defeated by the coalition of the "Three Princes" (Sima Jiong, Sima Ying and Sima Yong) and forced to commit suicide.

Sima Lun's usurpation was the beginning of a more destructive chapter in the War of the Eight Princes. No longer confined within the walls of Luoyang, the conflict had escalated into a series of full-blown civil wars that would devastate northern China for years to come.

== Early career ==
As Sima Yi's ninth and youngest son, Sima Lun held a number of minor titles during the Cao Wei regencies of his father and half-brothers Sima Shi and Sima Zhao. Around February or March 250, he was enfeoffed as Marquis of Anle Village, and when Sima Zhao established the Five Feudal Ranks of Zhou in 264, his fief was changed to Viscount of Dong'an, and he was designated Remonstrating and Consulting Grandee.

After his nephew Sima Yan established the Jin dynasty on 8 February 266, Sima Lun was named the Prince of Langye Commandery the next day. He served as a general and governor at times during his nephew's reign, but was undistinguished; several times he was accused of crimes, such as when sending Cavalier Commander Liu Ji to pay laborers wanting to rob imperial furs, but each time Emperor Wu pardoned him of them. On 5 October 277, his principality was moved to Zhao.

During the early reign of Emperor Hui, on 19 September 291, Sima Lun was placed in charge of the military command of Xu (徐州) and Yan (兖州) Provinces. About a month later, on 30 October, Lun's post was changed; he was placed in charge of the military command of Qin (秦州, modern eastern Gansu) and Yong (雍州, modern central and northern Shaanxi) Provinces. During his tenure, his misgovernance contributed to conditions where the Di and the Qiang rebelled under the Di chief Qi Wannian in 296. His chief strategist Sun Xiu was arrested and initially set to be executed, but was spared by his half-brother Sima Rong. Sima Lun and Sun were recalled to the capital Luoyang, where he flattered Empress Hui's empress Jia Nanfeng (who was then the de facto regent) and became trusted by her. Lun then requested a high level office, but was rebuffed by Empress Jia's advisors Zhang Hua and Pei Wei.

== As regent ==
Empress Jia, in jealousy, deposed the crown prince Sima Yu (Note: Sima Yu's mother was Emperor Hui's concubine Consort Xie Jiu.) in February 300. Later, there was a conspiracy to overthrow her and restore the crown prince. Sima Lun was persuaded to join the conspiracy, but Sun Xiu had another plan for him: he should encourage Empress Jia to assassinate the crown prince in exile, and then use the assassination as the excuse to overthrow her. Sima Lun accepted this plan and persuaded her to assassinate the crown prince, which she did in April 300. He then declared a coup against her in May and arrested her, slaughtering her clan and her associates (including Zhang and Pei). He then forced Empress Jia to commit suicide. Sima Lun was also apprehensive of Sima Yun (Prince of Huainan), the eldest living half-brother of Emperor Hui, so he attempted to take away Yun's military authority. Yun rebelled, nearly killing Lun, but one of Lun's supporters, Fu Yin (伏胤), pretended to defect to Yun and killed him, ending his rebellion. Lun killed sons and many associates of Yun.

Sima Lun then became regent for the developmentally disabled Emperor Hui, but was described as being not particularly more intelligent than Emperor Hui. Even though he carried the regent title, true power was in Sun Xiu's hands. Under Sun Xiu's persuasion, he deposed Emperor Hui and declared himself emperor in February 301, offering Emperor Hui the honorific title of retired emperor but putting him under house arrest. Emperor Hui's grandson, the crown prince Sima Zang (司馬臧), was executed.

== As emperor ==
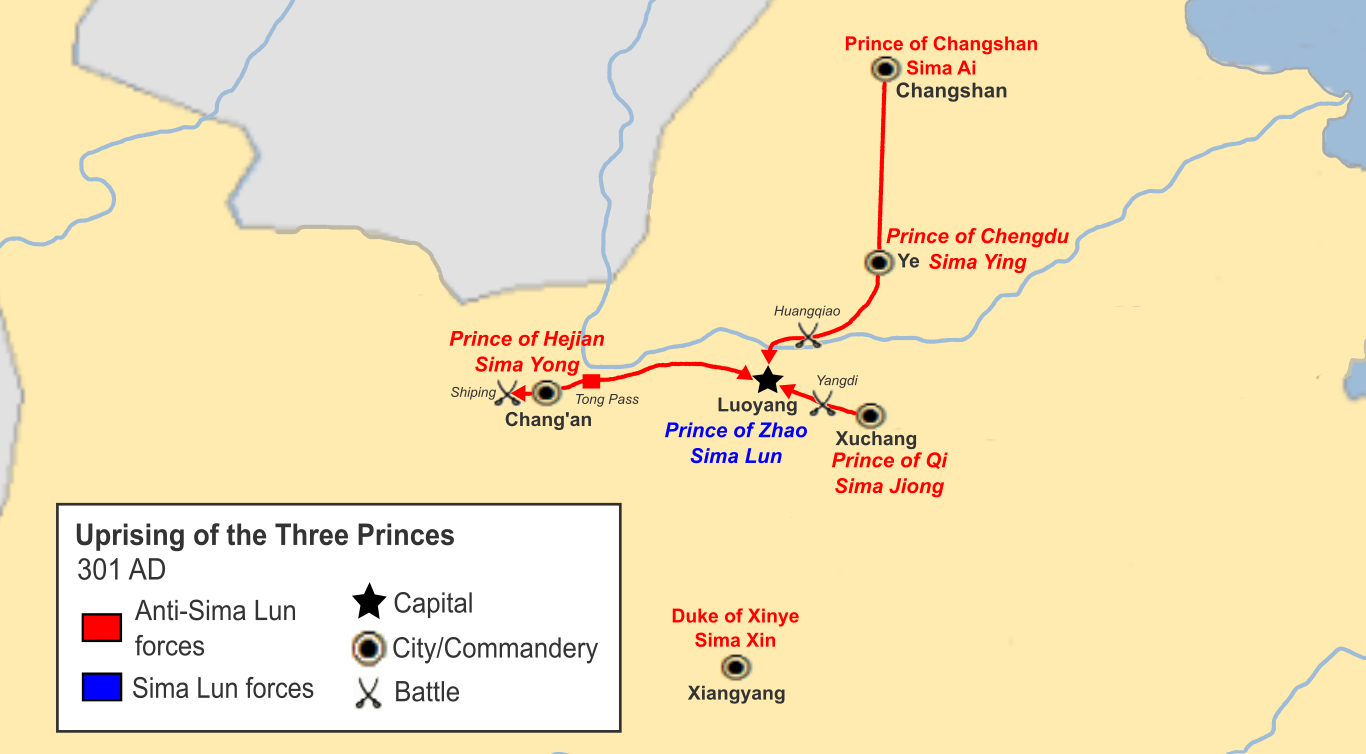
Uprising of the Three Princes, 301 AD.

The act of usurpation brought widespread anger. In order to appease those who might be angry at his usurpation, Sima Lun rewarded many people with honors. Sun, in particular, was issuing edicts based on his own whims. Suspecting three autonomous key princes—Sima Jiong the Prince of Qi (Emperor Hui's cousin and the son of Emperor Hui's uncle, Prince Xian of Qi Sima You), Sima Ying the Prince of Chengdu (Emperor Hui's half-brother), and Sima Yong the Prince of Hejian (the grandson of Emperor Hui's great-granduncle Sima Fu, Prince Xian of Anping), each of whom had strong independent military commands—Sun sent his trusted subordinates to be their assistants. Prince Jiong refused and declared a rebellion to restore Emperor Hui. Prince Ying, Sima Ai the Prince of Changshan (Emperor Hui's half-brother), and Sima Xin (司馬歆) the Duke of Xinye (the son of a granduncle of Emperor Hui, Sima Jun) all declared support for Prince Jiong. Prince Yong initially sent his general Zhang Fang (張方) with intent to support Sima Lun, but then heard that Princes Jiong and Ying had great forces, and so declared for the rebels instead. Sima Lun's forces were easily defeated by Princes Jiong's and Ying's forces, and after declaring himself emperor for three months, Sima Lun was captured by officials in Luoyang who declared for the rebellion as well and forced him to issue an edict returning the throne to Emperor Hui. Sima Lun was then arrested and forced to commit suicide. Sun and other associates of Sima Lun were executed, as were all of Sima Lun's sons. Sima Lun was posthumously demoted to commoner status, as "Commoner Zhao".

== Family ==
- Parents:
  - Sima Yi, Emperor Xuan (宣皇帝 司馬懿; 179–251)
  - Furen, of the Bai clan (夫人 柏氏)
- Sons:
  - Sima Fu (趙世子 司馬荂; d. 301)
  - Sima Fu, Prince Jiyang (濟陽王 司馬馥; d. 301)
  - Sima Qian, Prince Ruyin (汝陰王 司馬虔; d. 301)
  - Sima Xu, Marquis Bacheng (霸城侯 司馬詡; d. 301)

== Notes ==
Prince of Zhao House of Sima Born: c. 240 Died: 13 April 301
Titles in pretence
Preceded by Emperor Hui of Jin	— TITULAR — Emperor of China; Abdication claimant 3 February 301 – 30 May 301; Reason for succession failure: War of the Eight Princes	Succeeded by Emperor Hui of Jin
