= Eighteen History Books of Jin =

Collection of histories on the Jin dynasty before compilation of Tang-era Book of Jin

Eighteen History Books of Jin (十八家晋史; Shībā Jiā Jìn Shĭ) are the history books which were published and used as the history books of the Jin dynasty before the Book of Jin was published.

They consisted of nine Books of Jin and nine Annals of Jin. Many history books about the Jin dynasty began to disappear from the scene after the Tang-era Book of Jin was written in the Zhen'guan era (貞觀; 627–649) of the reign of Emperor Taizong of Tang and they became hard to find come the Song dynasty (960–1279).

Some of their contents are extant in the form of annotations found in Liu Yiqing's (劉義慶, 403–444) A New Account of the Tales of the World (Shishuo Xinyu; 世說新語), (Note: annotated by Liang dynasty scholar Liu Xiaobiao) Pei Songzhi's annotations in Records of the Three Kingdoms (c.429), Xiao Tong's (蕭統) book Wen Xuan (文選; c.520) (Note: see Wenxuan zhu) and Li Fang's book Imperial Readings of the Taiping Era (太平御覽: c. 980). In particular, Zang Rongxu's (臧榮緒: 415–488) Book of Jin and Wang Yin's (王隱) Book of Jin survived relatively intact to the present day.

As most of them were written during the Jin dynasty itself (and so are considered primary sources), it seems that they were incomplete and some of them were only of the Western Jin, though the Book of Jin by Zang Rongxu is thought to be more complete, since it recorded events from the time of Sima Yi, the first regent of Cao Wei from the Sima clan, to the fall of the Eastern Jin due to usurpation by Liu Yu (劉裕: 363–422), and it consisted of 110 volumes.

Therefore, Book of Jin of Fang Xuanling (房玄齡: 579–648) is thought to have relied on Zang Rongxu's book.

== The Nine Books of Jin (晉書) ==
=== Written during the Jin era ===
- 44 volumes, authored by Yu Yu (brother of Yu Xi) (Note: The Book of Sui (compiled during the Tang era) recorded that by the time it was compiled, only 26 volumes (out of the original 44) of Yu Yu's Jin Shu remained, and that the work only recorded events until the reign of Emperor Ming of Jin. Wang Yin's biography in the Tang-era Jin Shu recorded that Yu plagiarized Wang's work; he even resorted to gathering allies to defame Wang at court; eventually, Wang was dismissed from his post.) [虞預 『晉書』 （晉）]
- 14 volumes, authored by Zhu Feng (Note: The Book of Sui (compiled during the Tang era) recorded that by the time it was compiled, less than 10 volumes (out of the original 14) of Zhu Feng's Jin Shu remained, and that the work only recorded events until the reign of Emperor Yuan of Jin.) [朱鳳 『晉書』 （晉）]
- 93 volumes, authored by Wang Yin (Note: The Book of Sui (compiled during the Tang era) recorded that by the time it was compiled, only 86 volumes (out of the original 93) of Wang Yin's Jin Shu remained. Vol.12 of Shitong recorded that Wang Yin's Jin Shu had 89 volumes, and was completed with the financial support of Jin regent Yu Liang as Wang was too poor to secure the materials required; the work was completed in c.340 (6th year of the Xiankang era of the reign of Emperor Cheng of Jin).) (Note: Both Shitong and Wang Yin's biography in the Tang-era Jin Shu recorded that Wang's father Wang Quan (王铨) began recording events from the Jin era during his time. Readers could tell which parts of Wang's Jin Shu were written by his father, and which parts were by him: if the writing was well-organized and "worth reading", it was written by Wang Quan; if the writing style was confused and the content difficult to understand, it was by Wang Yin.) [王隱 『晉書』 （晉）]

=== Written during the Liu Song dynasty ===
- 36 volumes, authored by Xie Lingyun [謝靈運 『晉書』 （宋）]
- Jin Zhong Xing Shu, 78 volumes, authored by He Fasheng (Note: The Book of Sui recorded that Jin Zhong Xing Shu only recorded events from the Eastern Jin era.) [何法盛 『晉中興書』 （宋）]

=== Written during the Southern Qi era ===
- 110 volumes, authored by Zang Rongxu [臧榮緒 『晉書』 （斉）]

=== Written during the Southern Liang ===
- 110 volumes, authored by Xiao Ziyun [蕭子雲 『晉書』 （梁）]
- Jin Shi Cao ("Draft of History of Jin"), 30 volumes, authored by Xiao Zixian
- 111 volumes, authored by Shen Yue [沈約 『晉書』（梁）]

== The Nine Annals of Jin (晉紀) ==
=== Written during the Jin era ===
- 4 volumes, authored by Lu Ji [陸機 『晉紀』 （晉）]
- 20 volumes, authored by Gan Bao [干寶 『晉紀』 （晉）]
- 10 volumes, authored by Cao Jiazhi 曹嘉之 『晉紀』 （晉）]
- 11 volumes, authored by Deng Can (Note: Deng Can's work focused primarily on events during the reigns of Emperor Yuan and Emperor Ming.) [鄧粲 『晉紀』 （晉）]
- 46 volumes, authored by Xu Guang [徐廣 『晉紀』 （晉）]

=== Written during the Liu Song era ===
- 23 volumes, authored by Liu Qianzhi [劉謙之 『晉紀』 （宋）]
- 10 volumes, authored by Wang Shaozhi [王韶之 『晉安帝紀』 （宋）]
- Authored by Guo Jichan (Note: In Book of Sui, the name of Guo Jichan's work was recorded as Xu Jin Ji ("Continuation to Annals of Jin"), and had five volumes.) [郭季產 『晉錄』 （宋）]
- Authored by Pei Songzhi [裴松之 『晉紀』 （宋）]
