= Sima Jiong =

Western Jin dynasty Prince Wumin of Qi (died Jan 303)

Prince of Qi (齊王)
- Tenure: 28 April 283 – 27 January 303
- Predecessor: Sima You
- Issue: Sima Chao; Sima Bing; Sima Ying
Names
- Family name: Sima (司馬); Given name: Jiong (冏); Courtesy name: Jingzhi (景治)
Posthumous name
- Prince Wumin of Qi (齊武閔王)
- Father: Sima You
- Mother: Jia Bao/Quan (贾褒/贾荃)

Sima Jiong (Chinese: 司馬冏) (before 283 (Note: Although Sima Jiong's birth year was not recorded, his father Sima You was born in 246. Thus, Sima Jiong's birth year should be between 259 and 270.) – 27 January 303), (Note: According to the Book of Jin, Sima Jiong was defeated on the wuchen day of the 12th month of the year after the 1st year of the Yongning era of Emperor Hui's reign. This corresponds to 27 January 303 in the Julian calendar. According to the Zizhi Tongjian and Emperor Hui's biography in Book of Jin, the battle to subdue Sima Jiong began on the dingmao day of that month, which corresponds to 26 January 303. The Zizhi Tongjian also indicated that the battle lasted for 3 days and that Sima Jiong was executed very quickly after the battle ended, suggesting that he probably died on 29 January 303 (i.e. the gengwu day of that month).) courtesy name Jingzhi (景治), formally Prince Wumin of Qi (齊武閔王), was an imperial prince of the Jin dynasty of China. He briefly served as Emperor Hui's regent after overthrowing the usurper Sima Lun in May 301. He was the fourth of the eight princes commonly associated with the War of the Eight Princes.

The son of Sima You, he played a role in Sima Lun's coup against Empress Jia and her family, but was later transferred away from the capital, Luoyang to guard the city of Xuchang. When Sima Lun usurped the throne from Emperor Hui, Sima Jiong raised an army and led the coalition of the "Three Princes" (三王) to restore Emperor Hui to the throne. He was appointed the new regent of Emperor Hui after Sima Lun's defeat, but his arrogant and wasteful personality made him deeply unpopular within the court. Soon, his former allies the Prince of Hejian, Sima Yong and the Prince of Chengdu, Sima Ying accused him of treason and threatened Luoyang with their forces. Believing that the Prince of Changsha, Sima Ai was in league with the two from inside the city, Sima Jiong wanted to execute him first, but Ai retaliated and killed him after a few days of fighting.

== Early career ==
Sima Jiong was a son of Sima You, posthumously known as Prince Xian of Qi; You was the younger brother of Jin Dynasty's founder Emperor Wu, making Jiong Emperor Hui's cousin. Jiong was also a paternal grandson of Sima Zhao and Wang Yuanji, and a maternal grandson of Jia Chong and his first wife Li Wan. Sima You's abilities were so highly regarded by both his father Sima Zhao and the officials that, at times, he was considered as the proper heir, first for Sima Zhao, then for Emperor Wu. After Emperor Wu exiled him from the capital Luoyang in January 283, he died in April that year. Sima Jiong, as the oldest son of his wife Consort Jia Bao, (Note: Jia Bao was a daughter of Jia Chong and his former wife Li Wan. Her name was not recorded in official histories, but a Fu Ren Ji annotation in the Shishuo Xinyu gives her name as Wan. Lady Li was a daughter of Li Feng.) inherited his post, and complained to Emperor Wu about doctors' misdiagnosis. (Note: The doctors, who had thought that they would gain Emperor Wu's favor if they informed him that Prince You was healthy (so that he could indeed go to his principality), had minimized the illness that Prince You was suffering.)

As an imperial prince, Sima Jiong had a sizable number of troops under his command. When Sima Lun overthrew Emperor Hui's domineering wife Empress Jia Nanfeng in May 300 after she murdered Emperor Hui's crown prince Sima Yu in April, Sima Jiong was a participant of the coup — despite Empress Jia being his half-maternal-aunt, given that his mother had a feud with Empress Jia. (Note: According to Jia Nanfeng's biography in Book of Jin, it was precisely because of the bad blood between Jia Nanfeng and Jia Bao that Sima Lun sent Sima Jiong to depose Nanfeng as empress.) But Sima Jiong did not receive great rewards afterwards. He therefore resented Sima Lun. Sima Lun, seeing his resentment, tried to appease him by giving him an important military command—of Xuchang (許昌, in modern Xuchang, Henan).

== Role in overthrowing Sima Lun ==
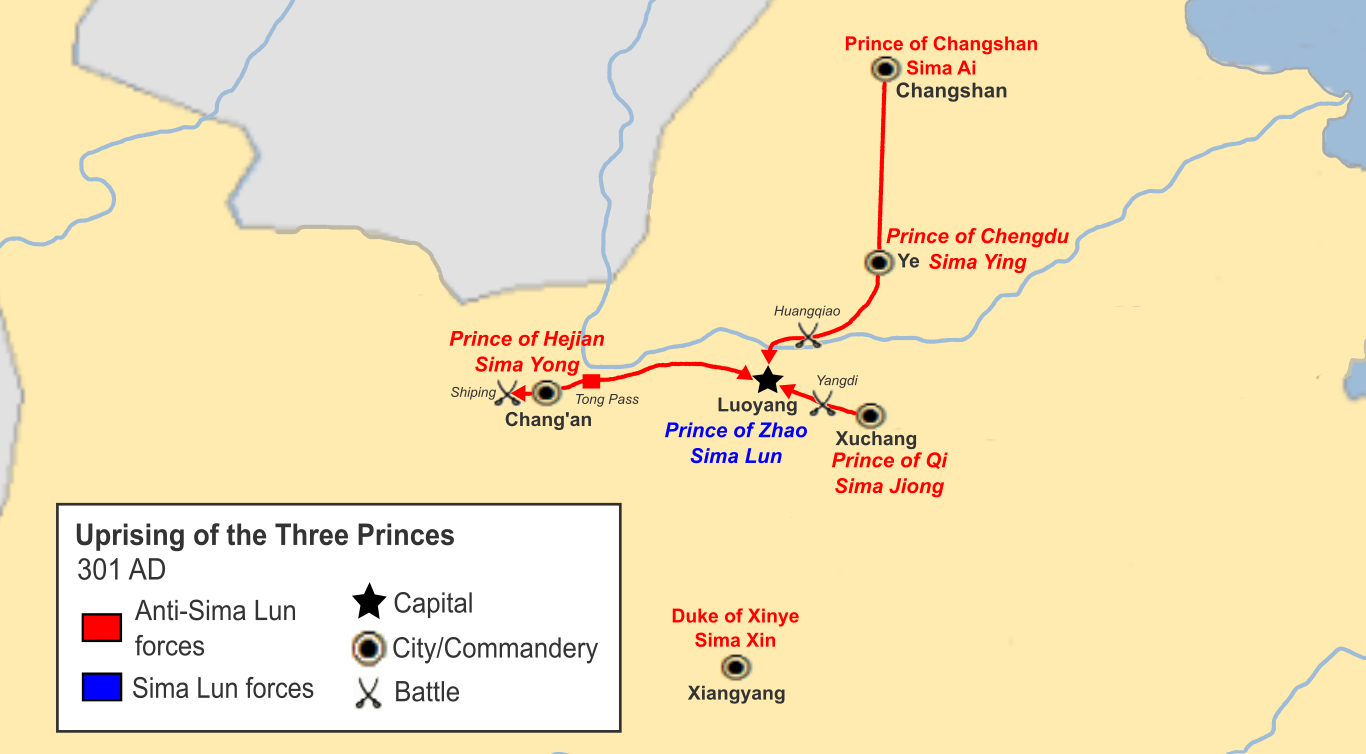
Uprising of the Three Princes, 301 AD.

After Sima Lun usurped the throne in February 301, he became concerned about Sima Jiong, Emperor Hui's half-brother Sima Ying the Prince of Chengdu and distant cousin Sima Yong the Prince of Hejian, each of whom had strong independent commands. He sent his close associates to serve as their assistants. Prince Jiong refused and declared a rebellion to restore Emperor Hui. Prince Ying, Sima Ai the Prince of Changshan (Emperor Hui's half-brother), and Sima Xin (司馬歆) the Duke of Xinye (a son of Sima Jun, a granduncle of Emperor Hui) all declared support for Prince Jiong. Prince Yong initially sent his general Zhang Fang (張方) with intent to support Sima Lun, but then heard that Princes Jiong and Ying had great forces, and so declared for the rebels instead. Sima Jiong's forces initially were stuck in a stalemate against Sima Lun's. But after Sima Ying's forces scored a major victory against another contingent of Sima Lun's troops, Sima Lun's troops collapsed, and Sima Jiong's and Sima Ying's forces approached Luoyang. Sima Lun was captured by officials in Luoyang who declared for the rebellion as well, and forced to issue an edict returning the throne to Emperor Hui. He was then forced to commit suicide in early June. Sun Xiu and other associates of Sima Lun had been executed earlier, in late May.

Some thought that a power balance that Emperor Wu had hoped for at his death might be restored; on August 11, (Note: [永宁元年]六月，....甲戌，诏以齐王冏为大司马，加九锡，备物典策，如宣、景、文、武辅魏故事；成都王颖为大将军，都督中外诸军事，假黄钺，录尚书事，加九锡，入朝不趋，剑履上殿；河间王颙为侍中、太尉，加三赐之礼；常山王乂为抚军大将军，领左军。进广陵公漼爵为王，领尚书，加侍中；进新野公歆爵为王，都督荆州诸军事，加镇南大将军。齐、成都、河间三府，各置掾属四十人，武号森列，文官备员而已，识者知兵之未戢也。) Princes Jiong and Ying were each given regent titles (and awarded the nine bestowments, in one rare case where the nine bestowments were not signs of an impending usurpation, although Prince Ying declined the bestowments, (Note: 成都王颖至邺，诏遣使者就申前命；颖受大将军，让九锡殊礼。) and many talented officials were promoted into important positions. However, the Princes Jiong and Ying were actually apprehensive of each other's power, and Prince Ying decided to yield the central government regency to Prince Jiong at the time and return to his defense post at Yecheng (鄴城, in modern Handan, Hebei).

After Sima Jiong defeated Sima Lun, while other clansmen of the Sima family and court officials sent oxen and wine as gifts to Sima Jiong, Jiong's granduncle Sima Gan offered him 100 cash. At their meeting, Sima Gan said, "The Prince of Zhao (Sima Lun) caused a rebellion and you managed to put it down; that is your credit. Now, I'm congratulating you using these 100 cash. Even so, it is very difficult to remain at a high position; you must be careful and cautious." (Note: 齐王冏之平赵王伦也，宗室朝士皆以牛酒劳冏，干独怀百钱，见冏乂之，曰：“赵王逆乱，汝能义举，是汝之功，今以百钱贺汝。虽然，大势难居，不可不慎。”)

== As regent ==
Sima Jiong became arrogant based on his accomplishments. He had his sons created princes, and ran the matters of the central government from his mansion, rarely visiting the emperor or attending the imperial meetings. He enlarged his mansion to be as large as the palace, and he entrusted matters to people who were close to him, and would not change his ways even when some of his more honest associates tried to change his behavior. When Emperor Hui's grandson Sima Shang (司馬尚; son of Sima Yu) died in childhood, leaving Emperor Hui without male descendants by May 302, Sima Ying was considered the appropriate successor, but Sima Jiong chose to bypass him by recommending the seven-year-old Sima Qin (司馬覃) the Prince of Qinghe (Emperor Hui's nephew and the son of his half-brother Sima Xia (司馬遐)) as the crown prince, with intent to easily control the young Crown Prince Qin.

After becoming regent, Sima Jiong once received a visit from his great-uncle Sima Gan. While Sima Jiong stepped out of the house and received Sima Gan with courtesy, upon entering the house, Sima Gan sat down on Jiong's bed and did not allow Jiong to be seated. Gan then said, "You must not emulate the son of that Bai woman (referring to Sima Lun)." (Note: 冏既辅政，干诣之，冏出迎拜。干入，踞其床，不命冏坐，语之曰：“汝勿效白女儿。”其意指伦也。)

Sima Jiong became suspicious of Sima Yong the Prince of Hejian—because Sima Yong had initially wanted to support Sima Lun, until he saw that Sima Lun's cause was hopeless. Sima Yong knew of Sima Jiong's suspicion, and started a conspiracy; he invited Sima Ai the Prince of Changsha to overthrow Sima Jiong, believing that Sima Ai would fail; his plan was then to, in conjunction with Sima Ying, start a war against Sima Jiong. Once they were victorious, he would depose Emperor Hui and make Sima Ying the emperor, and then serve as Sima Ying's prime minister. In winter 302, Sima Yong declared his rebellion, and Sima Ying soon joined, despite opposition from his strategist Lu Zhi. Hearing that Sima Ai was part of the conspiracy as well, Sima Jiong made a preemptive strike against Sima Ai, but Sima Ai was prepared and entered the palace to control Emperor Hui. After a street battle, Sima Jiong's forces collapsed, and he was executed. His sons Sima Chao (司馬超) the Prince of Huailing, Sima Bing (司馬冰) the Prince of Le'an, and Sima Ying (司馬英, note the different character from the Prince of Chengdu) the Prince of Jiyang were stripped of their titles and imprisoned.

== Posthumous developments ==
After Sima Jiong was killed, Sima Gan cried bitterly and told those around him, "The Sima clan is waning; only this child is the most capable. Now that he has died, the Sima clan is in peril!" (Note: 及冏诛，干哭之恸，谓左右曰：“宗室日衰，唯此儿最可，而复害之，从今殆矣！”) In 305, Sima Jiong's accomplishments were remembered, and his sons were released; Sima Chao was created a minor prince. After Emperor Huai became emperor in January 307, he further restored most of Sima Jiong's titles and awarded him a posthumous name. When Emperor Huai was later captured by Han-Zhao's emperor Liu Cong during the Disaster of Yongjia, Sima Jiong's sons were captured and executed by Han-Zhao forces, and Sima Jiong was left without descendants.

== Notes ==
Prince of Qi House of Sima Died: 302
Chinese royalty
Preceded by Sima You	Prince of Qi; 283–302	Vacant Title next held by Liu Yu
