= Sima Ying =

Sima Ying 司馬穎
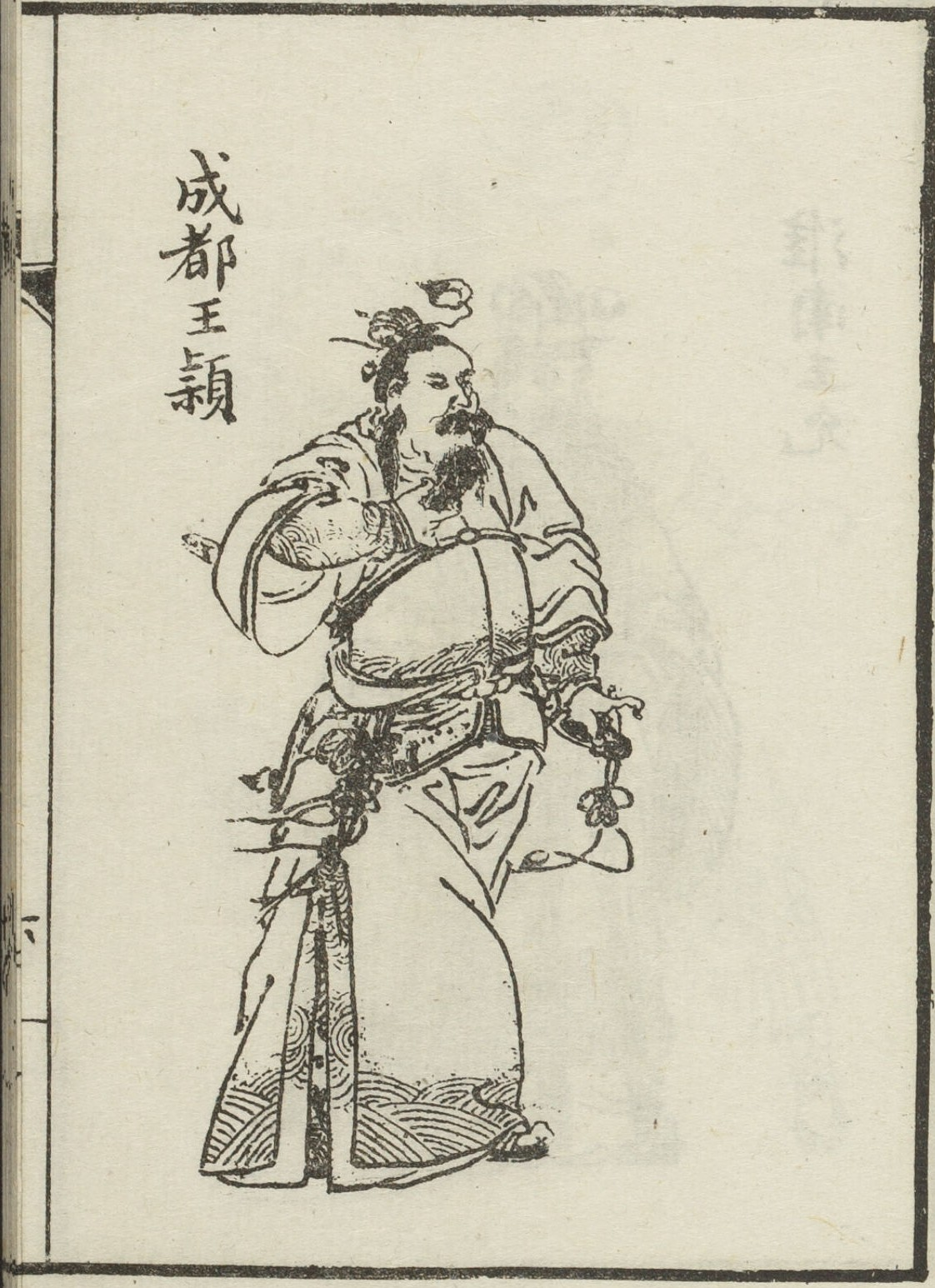

Crown Prince of the Jin dynasty
- Tenure: 1 May 304 - 4 February 305
- Predecessor: Sima Tan
- Successor: Sima Chi

Prince of Chengdu (成都王)
- Tenure: 22 December 289 – c.December 306
- Born: 279
- Died: 306 (aged 26–27)
- Father: Emperor Wu of Jin
- Mother: Lady Cheng

Sima Ying (司馬穎) (279 (Note: Sima Ying's biography in Book of Jin indicated that he was 28 (by East Asian reckoning) when he died. Thus by calculation, his birth year should be 279.) – c.December 306), courtesy name Zhangdu (章度), was a Jin dynasty imperial prince who served briefly as his half-brother Emperor Hui of Jin's regent and crown prince. He was the sixth of eight princes commonly associated with the War of the Eight Princes. His title was the Prince of Chengdu (成都王), but he did not receive any posthumous names.

During Empress Jia Nanfeng's rule behind the throne, Sima Ying was assigned to guard the important city of Ye in Hebei. He formed a coalition with the Prince of Qi, Sima Jiong and the Prince of Hejian, Sima Yong to overthrow the usurper Sima Lun and restore Emperor Hui in 301. As the last of his half-brother's male descendants died, he developed ambitions to install himself as crown prince. He allied himself with Sima Yong to gain control of Emperor Hui from Sima Jiong and later the Prince of Changsha, Sima Ai, eventually succeeding in 304. However, he was soon attacked by the Prince of Donghai, Sima Yue and his allies, forcing him to abandon his power base and seek refuge with Sima Yong. Under Sima Yong, he was stripped of his title as crown prince and reduced to a mere general. He attempted to flee back to Hebei in 306, but was captured and executed.

Despite his ambitions and ruthlessness towards his half-brothers, Emperor Hui and Sima Ai, he was also popular among the people of Hebei for his benevolent rule. After his death, the rebels, Gongshi Fan and Ji Sang rose up in Hebei against Sima Yue, using the pretext of avenging the late prince to win the support of the populace.

== Early career ==
Sima Ying was Sima Yan's 19th son, (Note: Sima Ying's biography in the Tang-era Book of Jin recorded that he was the 16th son.) by his concubine Consort Cheng. On 22 December 289, Emperor Wu created him the Prince of Chengdu, with a fiefdom of 10000 households. After Emperor Wu died in May 290 and Emperor Hui succeeded to the throne, Sima Ying remained in the capital Luoyang as he was eleven at the time. However, after he once rebuked Jia Mi (賈謐), a nephew of Emperor Hui's powerful wife Empress Jia Nanfeng, for disrespecting Emperor Hui's son Sima Yu the crown prince, Empress Jia sent Sima Ying away from the capital to take up the defense post for the important city of Yecheng (鄴城, in modern Handan, Hebei). Sima Ying was handsome but not much more intelligent than his developmentally disabled half-brother Emperor Hui. However, he developed a good reputation among officials and the people by being lenient, filial to his mother Princess Dowager Cheng, and listening to the advice of his capable advisor Lu Zhi.

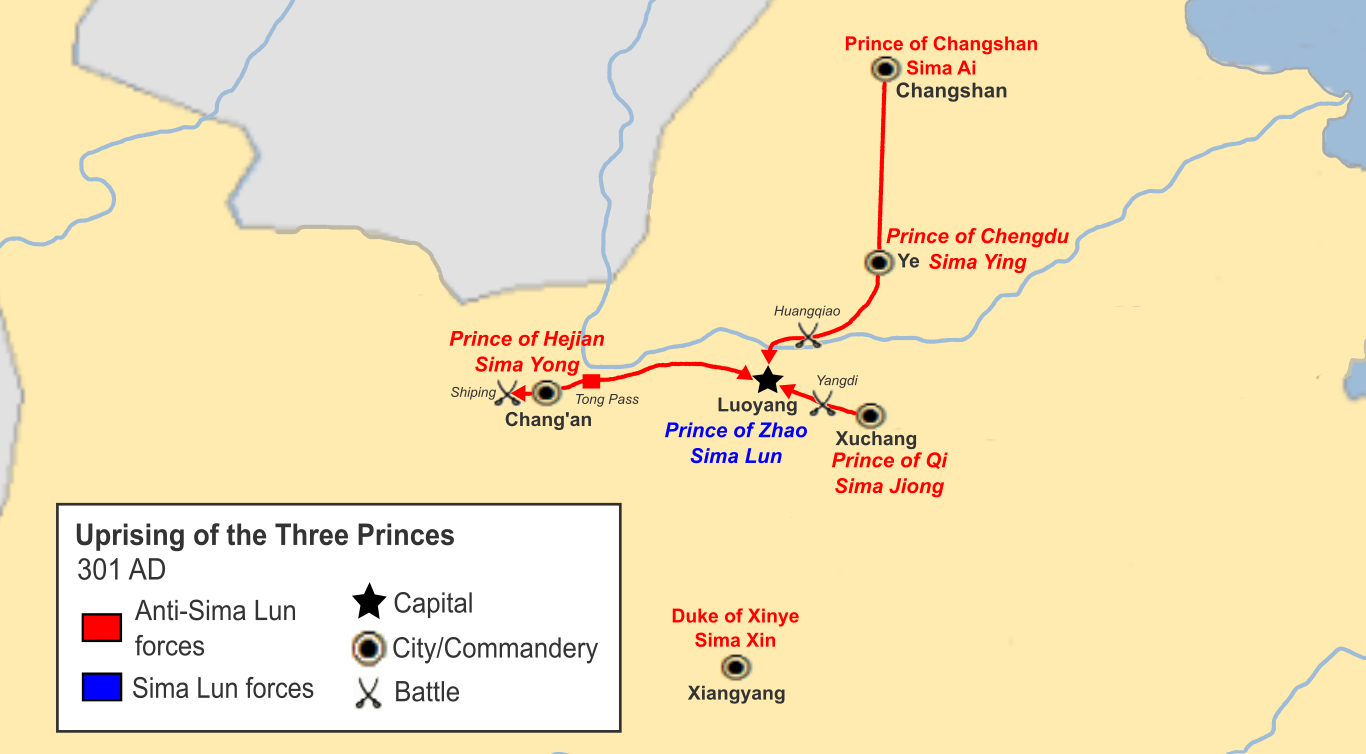
Uprising of the Three Princes, 301 AD.

After Empress Jia falsely accused Crown Prince Yu of crimes, deposed him on 6 February 300 and then later murdered him in April that year, she was overthrown by Emperor Hui's granduncle Sima Lun, the Prince of Zhao in May. Sima Lun then usurped the throne in February 301. Suspecting three key princes—Sima Ying, Sima Jiong the Prince of Qi (Emperor Hui's cousin and a son of Emperor Hui's uncle, Sima You), and Sima Yong the Prince of Hejian (a grandson of Emperor Hui's great-granduncle Sima Fu, Prince Xian of Anping), each of whom had strong independent military commands—Sun sent his trusted subordinates to be their assistants. Prince Jiong refused and declared a rebellion to restore Emperor Hui. At Lu's suggestion, Sima Ying declared for the rebellion as well, and as Sima Jiong's forces were stuck in a stalemate against Sima Lun's troops, Sima Ying defeated the other wing of Sima Lun's forces, causing them to collapse. As Sima Jiong and Sima Ying's forces approached Luoyang. Sima Lun was captured by officials in Luoyang who declared for the rebellion as well, and forced to issue an edict returning the throne to Emperor Hui. He was then forced to commit suicide in June. The associates of Sima Lun were executed.

== After overthrowing Sima Lun ==
Some thought that a power balance that Emperor Wu had hoped for at his death might be restored, as Princes Jiong and Ying were each given regent titles (Note: Both princes were also awarded the nine bestowments, in one rare case where the nine bestowments were not signs of an impending usurpation, although Prince Ying declined the bestowments.), and many talented officials were promoted into important positions. However, the Princes Jiong and Ying were actually apprehensive of each other's power, and Prince Ying decided to yield the central government regency to Prince Jiong at the time and return to his defense post at Yecheng. When he bid farewell to Sima Jiong, he did not talk about politics at all but only about his mother's illness, and this brought further praise on his character, as did his subsequent acts to collect the bodies of soldiers who had died in the war against Sima Lun to give them proper burials.

In the capital, Sima Jiong became arrogant based on his accomplishments. He had his sons created princes, and ran the matters of the central government from his mansion, rarely visiting the emperor or attending the imperial meetings. He enlarged his mansion to be as large as the palace, and he entrusted matters to people who were close to him, and would not change his ways even when some of his more honest associates tried to change his behavior. When Emperor Hui's grandsons (and sons of Sima Yu) Sima Zang and Sima Shang (司馬尚), successive crown princes, died in childhood, leaving Emperor Hui without male descendants by May 302, Sima Ying was considered the appropriate successor, but Sima Jiong chose to bypass him by recommending the seven-year-old Sima Tan, (Note: The character "覃" has multiple pronunciations: "qín", "tán", "yǎn" and "xún".) the Prince of Qinghe (Note: Emperor Hui's nephew and a son of his half-brother Sima Xia (司馬遐)) as the crown prince on 6 July, with intent to easily control the young Crown Prince Tan.

Sima Jiong became suspicious of Sima Yong the Prince of Hejian—because Sima Yong had initially wanted to support Sima Lun, until he saw that Sima Lun's cause was hopeless. Sima Yong knew of Sima Jiong's suspicion, and started a conspiracy; he invited Sima Ai the Prince of Changsha to overthrow Sima Jiong, believing that Sima Ai would fail; his plan was then to start a war against Sima Jiong in conjunction with Sima Ying. Once they were victorious, he would depose Emperor Hui and make Sima Ying the emperor, and then serve as Sima Ying's prime minister. In winter 302, Sima Yong declared his rebellion, and Sima Ying soon joined, despite opposition from Lu Zhi. Hearing that Sima Ai was part of the conspiracy as well, Sima Jiong made a preemptive strike against Sima Ai, but Sima Ai was prepared and entered the palace to control Emperor Hui. After a street battle, Sima Jiong's forces collapsed, and he was executed in January 303. Sima Ai became the effective regent, but in order to reduce opposition, he submitted all important matters to Sima Ying, still stationed at Yecheng.

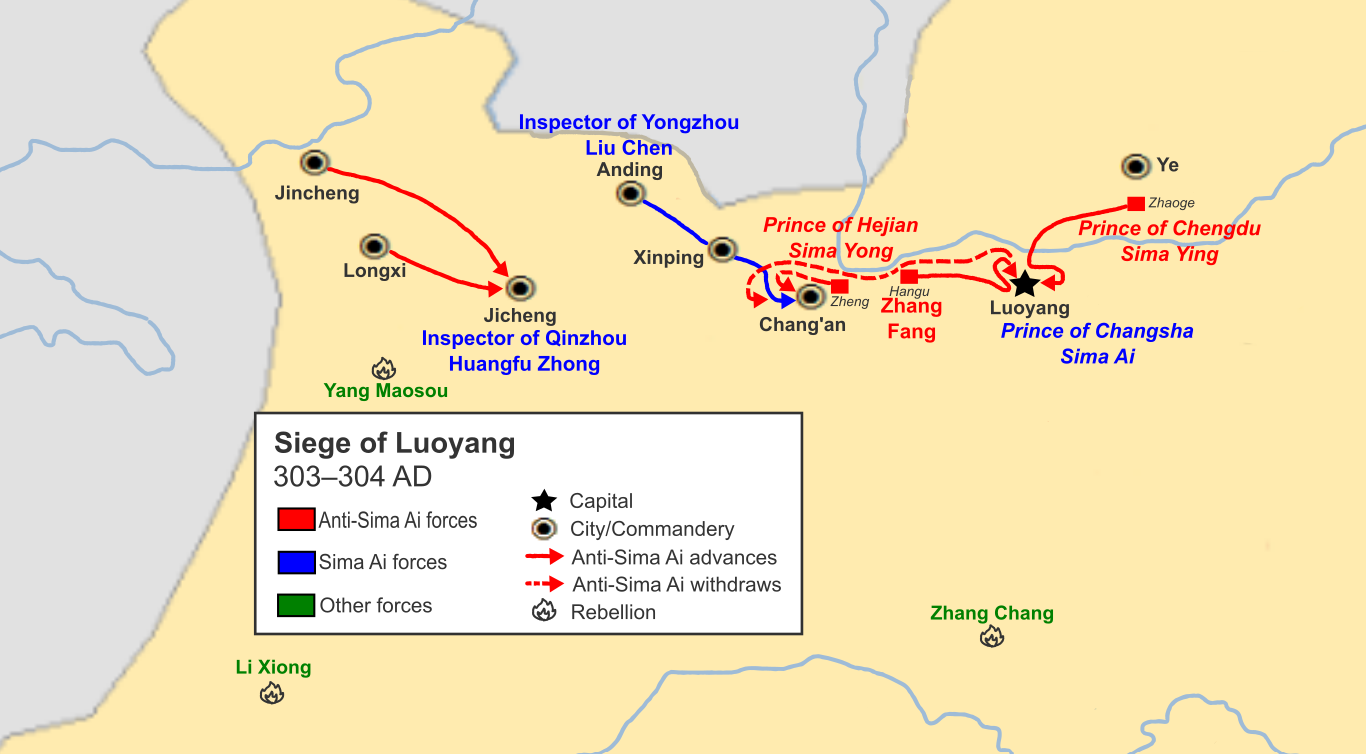
Siege of Luoyang, 303–304 AD.

After Sima Jiong's death, Sima Ying became extremely arrogant as well, and trusted inappropriate persons, chief among whom was his servant Meng Jiu (孟玖). Even though Sima Ai submitted all important matters to him, he still considered Sima Ai an interference to his control of government and wanted to eliminate him. At the same time, Sima Yong, who had hoped that if Sima Ying became emperor he could then be prime minister, persuaded Sima Ying to again join him against Sima Ai. They started military action against Sima Ai in fall of 303, and while they had overwhelming force, their forces could not score a conclusive victory against Sima Ai. Sima Yong's forces were about to withdraw in spring 304 when Sima Yue the Prince of Donghai, the grandson of Sima Tai (司馬泰; a great-granduncle of Emperor Hui), believing that Sima Ai could not win this war, arrested him and delivered him to Sima Yong's general Zhang Fang (張方), who executed Sima Ai cruelly by burning him to death. Sima Ying became in effective control of the government, but continued to control it remotely from Yecheng.

== As regent and crown prince ==
Sima Ying soon ordered Emperor Hui's second wife, Yang Xianrong, and his crown prince Sima Tan, deposed. Then, at Sima Yong's pre-arranged petition, Sima Ying was created the crown prince. He put people he trusted in charge of the defenses of Luoyang, while remotely controlling the government from Yecheng. Eventually, the officials in Luoyang tired of the situation, and they rose under Sima Yue's command in 20 August 304. Sima Yue, with Emperor Hui accompanying him, then attacked Yecheng. Sima Ying, after some initial hesitation, battled Sima Yue's troops and defeated him, forcing him to flee and capturing Emperor Hui. He did not return Emperor Hui to Luoyang, but kept him at Yecheng. On 18 September, he executed Sima Yao, as Yao had suggested surrendering when Yue was attacking Yecheng.

This gave Wang Jun (王浚), the commander of the forces in You Province (幽州, modern Beijing, Tianjin, and northern Hebei), with whom Sima Ying had prior disputes, an excuse to attack Sima Ying, and he did so, claiming that Sima Ying was improperly detaining Emperor Hui. Wang's forces were reinforced with ferocious Xianbei and Wuhuan soldiers, and Sima Ying's forces, in fear of their fighting abilities, collapsed, before they could be reinforced with Xiongnu forces under the command of Sima Ying's associate Liu Yuan. Sima Ying was forced to flee to Luoyang with Emperor Hui, now without troops to support him. (Note: Upon knowledge of Sima Ying's collapse, Liu Yuan, instead of coming to Sima Ying's aid, declared independence from Jin and styled himself the Prince of Han, claiming descent (through a princess) from the Han dynasty, thus creating Han-Zhao.) In late 304, Li Xiong occupied Sima Ying's fiefdom of Chengdu, and declared himself Prince of Chengdu.

Once Sima Ying arrived in Luoyang, he found the troops of his ally Sima Yong there, commanded by Zhang Fang. Instead of continuing to support Sima Ying, however, Sima Yong turned his back on Sima Ying and had him removed from his crown prince position, instead creating another half-brother of Emperor Hui, Sima Chi the Prince of Yuzhang, crown prince. Sima Ying was demoted back to being the Prince of Chengdu. Soon, Zhang forced Emperor Hui, Crown Prince Chi, and Sima Ying to move from Luoyang to Chang'an, safely under Sima Yong's control.

== After removal as crown prince ==
After Sima Ying was removed as crown prince, the people of Yecheng nevertheless missed the days when he was considered a capable governor, under Lu's guidance. In 305, his former subordinates, the generals Gongshi Fan (公師藩) and Ji Sang therefore declared a rebellion, seeking to restore him. Sima Yong sent Sima Ying to try to pacify or suppress the rebellion, but while he was on the way to Yecheng, Sima Yue declared a rebellion with the ostensible goal of returning Emperor Hui to Luoyang, and Sima Ying was unable to progress to Yecheng; he instead returned to Chang'an. After Sima Yue defeated Sima Yong in 306 and welcomed Emperor Hui back to Luoyang, he put out an order for Sima Ying's arrest, and Sima Ying fled with his sons Sima Pu (司馬普) the Prince of Lujiang and Sima Kuo (司馬廓) the Prince of Zhongdu, attempting to flee to Gongshi, when he was intercepted by Feng Song (馮嵩) the governor of Dunqiu Commandery (頓丘, roughly modern Puyang, Henan) and taken to Yecheng. The defender of that city, Sima Xiao (司馬虓) the Prince of Fanyang (Note: a cousin of Sima Yue and his brothers Sima Teng, Sima Lue and Sima Mo; Sima Xiao, Sima Yue and Yue's brothers were all grandsons of Sima Kui, brother of Sima Yi, per vol.37 of Book of Jin.), imprisoned Sima Ying but did not wish to kill him. However, when Sima Xiao died later that year, his secretary Liu Yu (Note: brother of Liu Kun), worried that there were still many of Sima Ying's supporters in the city, forged an edict ordering Sima Ying to commit suicide. His two sons were also killed with him. After Ji captured Yecheng in 307, he placed Sima Ying's casket on a wagon in his command train, and he would report all important decisions to Sima Ying's casket. After Ji was defeated on 11 January 308, Sima Ying's casket was thrown in a well, and his former associates took it out of the well and buried it.
