= Sima Ai =

Prince of Changsha

- 司馬乂

Regent of the Jin dynasty
- In office January 303 – March 17, 304
- Monarch: Emperor Hui

Personal details
- Born: 277
- Died: March 20, 304 (aged 26–27)
- Parents: Emperor Wu of Jin (father); Lady Shen (mother)

Prince of Changsha (長沙王)
- Tenure: 22 December 289 – September 291; 31 August 301 – March 17, 304

Prince of Changshan (常山王)
- Tenure: 19 September 291 – August 301
Posthumous name
- Prince Li of Changsha (長沙厲王)

Sima Ai or Sima Yi (司馬乂) (Note: The character "乂" has two pronunciations: "ài" and "yì".) (277 – 19/20 March 304 (Note: The Zizhi Tongjian indicated that Sima Ai was killed on the bingyin day (28th day) of the 1st month of the 1st year of the Yongxing era, which corresponds to 20 Mar 304 in the Julian calendar. However, Emperor Hui's biography in Book of Jin indicated that Sima Ai was imprisoned in Jinyong on the guihai day of the 11th month of the 2nd year of the Tai'an era, and was killed shortly after; there was no guihai day in that month. Sima Ai's biography in Book of Jin also indicated that he was deposed as Prince of Changsha on the 25th day (guihai day) of the 1st month of the 1st year of the Yongxing era, and killed on the 27th day (yichou day) of the same month. Combining the accounts in volume 85 of Zizhi Tongjian and volume 59 of Jin Shu, it was most likely that Sima Ai was deposed as Prince of Changsha and imprisoned in Jinyong on 17 March 304, and killed on 19 or 20 March 304. His biography also indicated that he was 28 (by East Asian reckoning) when he died. Thus by calculation, his birth year should be 277. In his Zizhi Tongjian Kaoyi, Sima Guang recorded the discrepancies in various sources on Ai's death, and indicated that Tongjian followed the account in Ai's biography in Book of Jin.)), courtesy name Shidu (士度), (Note: The Taiping Yulan, citing another Jin Shu, recorded that his courtesy name was Shiqing.) formally Prince Li of Changsha (長沙厲王), was a Jin dynasty imperial prince who briefly served as regent for his half-brother Emperor Hui. He was the fifth of the eight princes commonly associated with the War of the Eight Princes. Of the eight princes, he alone received praises from historians, for his attempt to reform government and his courtesy to Emperor Hui, who was developmentally disabled. (Note: In contrast, the Jin court considered him worthy of condemnation, as "Li" was an unflattering posthumous name; see King Li of Zhou and Cao Fang (Duke Li of Shaoling). Also, the Jin Zhongxing Shu and Shishuo Xinyu both recorded that Sima Ai cultivated cronies and acted against righteous officials during his time as regent, with Jin Zhongxing Shu citing his persecution of Xie Kun (father of Xie Shang).) According to the Book of Jin, Sima Ai was a strong and resolute man and was seven chi and five cun tall (approximately 1.84 metres).

== Life ==
Sima Ai was Emperor Wu's seventeenth son, (Note: Sima Ai's biography in the Tang-era Book of Jin recorded that he was the sixth son. The biographies of Sima Zhao (Prince Ai of Chengyang and Emperor Wu's full younger brother) and Sima Jing in the same work recorded that after the Prince of Chengyang's death, Enmperor Wu chose his son Sima Jing (courtesy name Jingdu, and also Sima AI's full elder brother) to be the Prince of Chengyang's heir. After Sima Jing's death in 270, Emperor Wu consecutively chose his fifth son Sima Xian and sixth son Sima Zhi as the Prince of Chengyang's heir. Hence, the Tang-era Book of Jin contradicted itself on who Emperor Wu's sixth son was.) born of the same mother as Sima Wei, the Prince of Chu (Lady Shen); their elder full-brother Sima Jing, Prince Huai of Chengyang, had died in 270 before they were born. He was granted the title Prince of Changsha in 22 December 289. When his father died in May 290, Sima Ai was praised by many for his display of filial piety. When Sima Wei, at the command of Emperor Hui's wife Empress Jia Nanfeng, killed the regents Sima Liang the Prince of Ru'nan and Wei Guan, Sima Ai participated. Subsequently, when Empress Jia claimed that Sima Wei had forged the edict and executed him, Sima Ai was demoted to the lesser title of Prince of Changshan on 19 September 291. Despite this, during the next decade, he received renown for his decisiveness, talents, and humility. When Sima Lun the Prince of Zhao usurped the throne in February 301, Sima Ai was at his principality, and he led his own troops to join the forces of his half-brother Sima Ying the Prince of Chengdu against Sima Lun. Once Sima Ying and Sima Jiong the Prince of Qi were able to defeat and overthrow Sima Lun and restore Emperor Hui, Sima Ai, for his accomplishments, was restored to his original title as the Prince of Changsha in August 301.

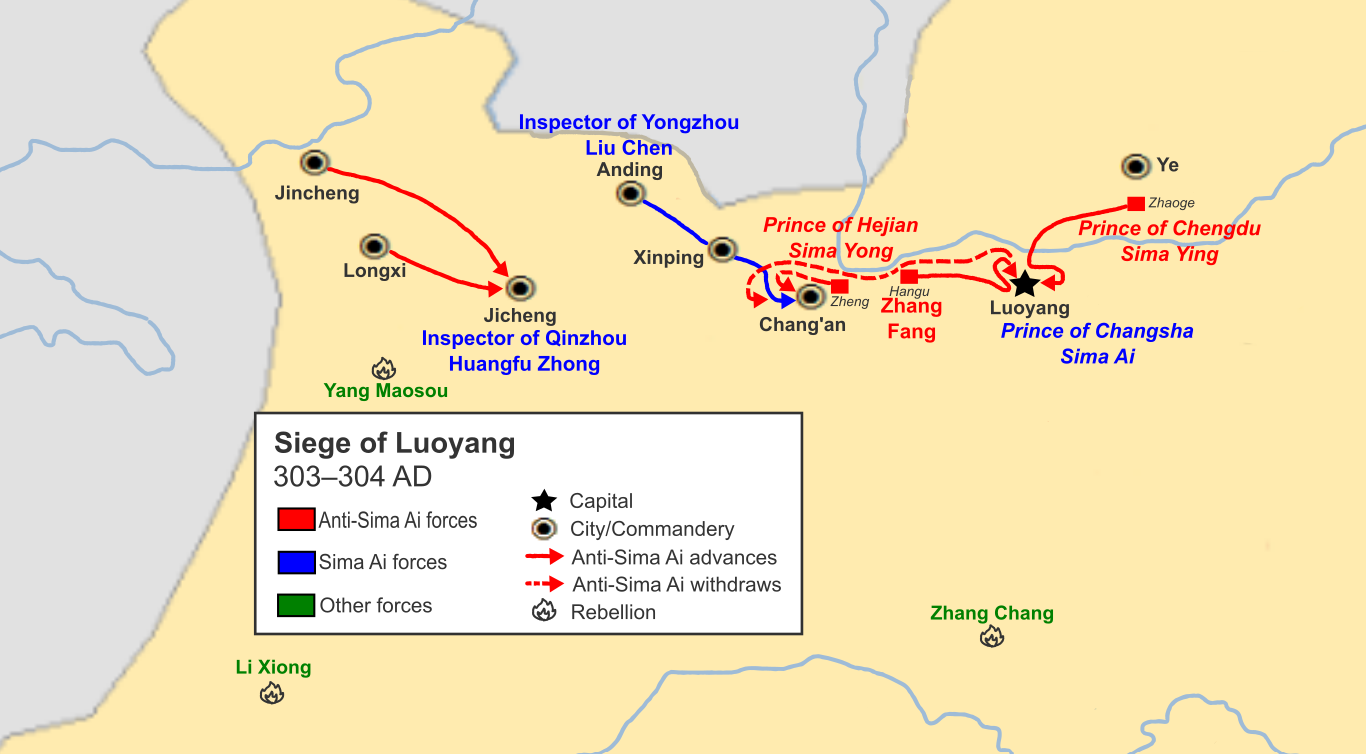
Siege of Luoyang, 303–304 AD.

After overthrowing Sima Lun, Sima Jiong became the regent—as Sima Ying, who was initially named co-regent with him, declined and returned to his stronghold of Yecheng. He became arrogant and extremely controlling, and failed to pay even basic courtesies to Emperor Hui. He also became suspicious of Sima Yong the Prince of Hejian, (Note: grandson of Emperor Hui's great-granduncle Sima Fu, Prince Xian of Anping) because Sima Yong had initially wanted to support Sima Lun, until he saw that Sima Lun's cause was hopeless. Sima Yong knew of Sima Jiong's suspicion, and started a conspiracy; he invited Sima Ai to overthrow Sima Jiong, believing that Sima Ai would fail; his plan was then to, in conjunction with Sima Ying, start a war against Sima Jiong. Once they were victorious, he would depose Emperor Hui and make Sima Ying the emperor, and then serve as Sima Ying's prime minister. In winter 302, Sima Yong declared his rebellion, and Sima Ying soon joined, despite opposition from his strategist Lu Zhi. Hearing that Sima Ai was part of the conspiracy as well, Sima Jiong made a preemptive strike against Sima Ai, but Sima Ai was prepared and entered the palace to control Emperor Hui. After a street battle, Sima Jiong's forces collapsed, and he was executed in late January 303.

Sima Ai became the effective regent, but in order to reduce opposition, he submitted all important matters to Sima Ying, still stationed at Yecheng. As regent, he paid attention to reforming the government, and he saw the importance of formally honoring Emperor Hui while maintaining resemblance to impartial governance. He continued to try to share power with Sima Ying. However, in fall 303, Sima Yong, dissatisfied that his plan did not come to fruition, persuaded Sima Ying to again join him against Sima Ai. While Sima Yong and Sima Ying had overwhelming force, their forces could not score a conclusive victory against Sima Ai. Sima Ai made overtures to try to achieve peace with Sima Ying, but after negotiations, those efforts failed. Sima Yong's forces were about to withdraw in spring 304 when Sima Yue the Prince of Donghai, the grandson of a great-granduncle of Emperor Hui, (Note: Sima Yue's grandfather was Sima Kui, a younger brother of Emperor Hui's great-grandfather Sima Yi.) believing that Sima Ai could not win this war, arrested him and delivered him to Sima Yong's general Zhang Fang (張方), who executed Sima Ai cruelly by burning him to death. (Note: Before he was executed, Sima Ai was able to write a touching letter of farewell to Emperor Hui.) As Sima Ai cried out in pain, even Zhang's forces were mourning for his fate.
