= Sima Yong =

Jin dynasty imperial prince (died January 307)

Sima Yong 司馬顒

Prince of Hejian (河間王)
- Tenure: 5 October 277 – c.late January 307

Prince of Taiyuan (太原王)
- Tenure: 13 March 274 – 4 October 277
- Born: before 274
- Died: c.late January 307
- House: Jin dynasty
- Father: Sima Gui

Sima Yong (司馬顒) (before 274 - c.late January 307), courtesy name Wenzai (文載), was a Jin dynasty imperial prince and briefly a regent for Emperor Hui. He was the seventh of eight princes commonly associated with the War of the Eight Princes. His title was the Prince of Hejian (河間王), but he did not receive any posthumous names.

Though a distant cousin of Emperor Hui, Sima Yong was garrisoned at the important city of Chang'an to guard the Guanzhong region. When the Prince of Zhao, Sima Lun usurped the throne in 301, Sima Yong initially sided with him, but later joined the Prince of Qi, Sima Jiong, and the Prince of Chengdu, Sima Ying, in their coalition to restore Emperor Hui.

After the restoration, Sima Yong grew disaffected with the regency of Sima Jiong and rekindled his alliance with Sima Ying, who vied to become Emperor Hui's crown prince. They campaigned against Sima Jiong and later the Prince of Changsha, Sima Ai at Luoyang, eventually gaining control of Emperor Hui in 304. When Sima Ying was defeated by the Prince of Donghai, Sima Yue and his allies later that year, Sima Yong forcibly seized Emperor Hui for himself and relocated him to Chang'an. Under his paramountcy, he attempted to negotiate peace with Sima Yue and had the empire governed under two courts; the Western Court in Chang'an and the Eastern Court in Luoyang. In fall 305, Sima Yue, with a large force in the east, formed a coalition against Sima Yong to bring Emperor Hui back to Luoyang. Sima Yong was defeated the following year and lost the emperor, but he was able to recapture Chang'an and held out in the city before he was assassinated in early 307.

== Early career ==
Sima Yong was a grandson of Sima Fu, Prince Xian of Anping, a younger brother of Sima Yi and granduncle of the founder of the Jin Dynasty, Emperor Wu; Yong was thus a second cousin of Emperor Wu. His father Sima Gui (司馬瑰) was Prince Lie of Taiyuan (太原烈王), and after Gui's death in 12 March 274, Sima Yong inherited his principality. In 276, he was sent to his principality (roughly modern Taiyuan, Shanxi), but on 5 October 277 his principality was moved to Hejian (河間, roughly modern Cangzhou, Hebei). He became known for his skill in finding capable associates (e.g. Yu Song), and when he visited the capital Luoyang on an official visit, Emperor Wu became impressed by him and stated that he could be a good example to other princes. On 19 September 291, during the reign of Emperor Hui, Sima Yong was sent to garrison Yecheng. In February or March 299, he was put in charge of defending the important city of Chang'an—a post which Emperor Wu had left instructions that only someone who was closely related to the emperor should be allowed to take, but which the high level officials found appropriate for Sima Yong due to his reputation.

== Participation in various campaigns during the War of the Eight Princes ==
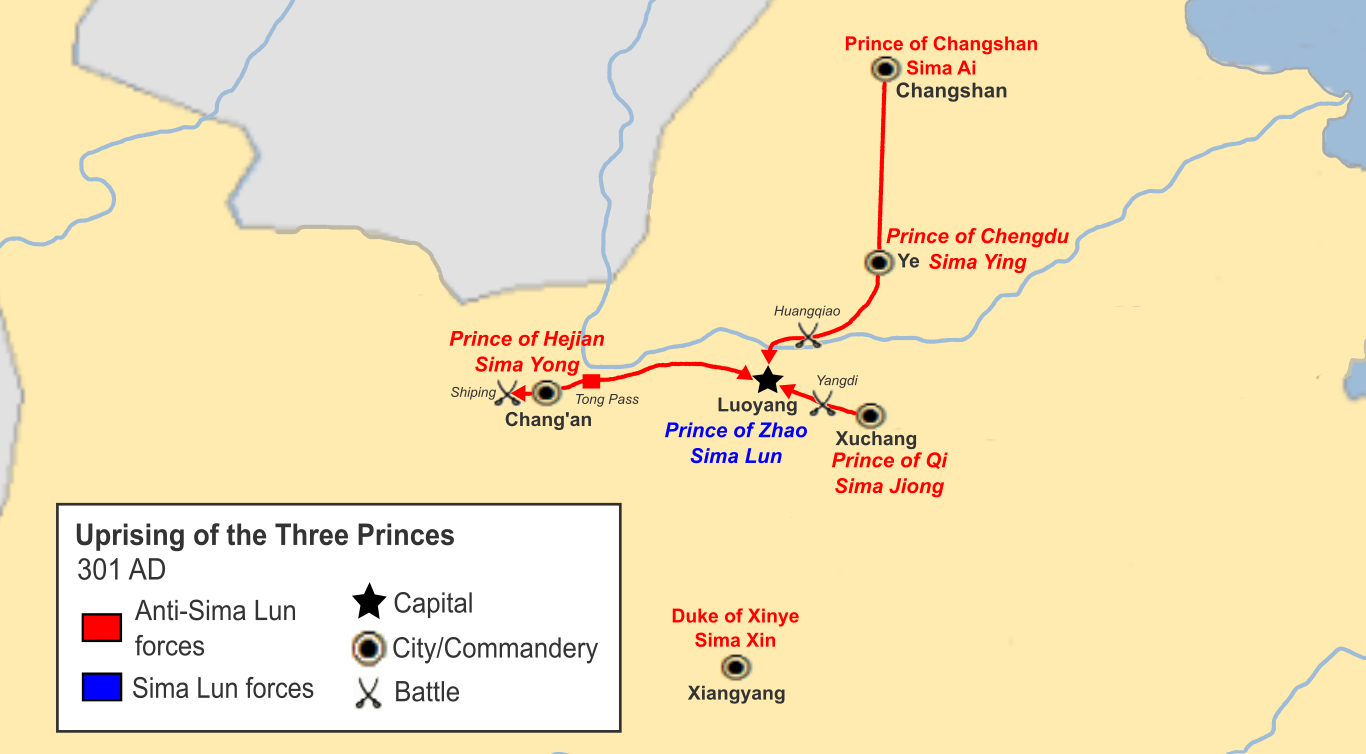
Uprising of the Three Princes, 301 AD.

When Emperor Hui's throne was usurped by Sima Lun the Prince of Zhao in February 301, Sima Jiong the Prince of Qi (Emperor Hui's cousin) started a rebellion to restore Emperor Hui. Initially, Sima Yong sent his general Zhang Fang (張方) to support Sima Lun, but once he heard that Sima Jiong and his ally, Sima Ying the Prince of Chengdu (Emperor Hui's half-brother) had overwhelming force, he switched side and declared for the rebels. After Princes Jiong and Ying defeated and killed Sima Lun, Prince Jiong became regent and he, while angry at Sima Yong for initially supporting Sima Lun, nevertheless granted him additional honors as well as three of the nine bestowments.

Sima Yong, however, knew that Sima Jiong was angry at him, and he started a conspiracy; he invited Sima Ai the Prince of Changsha (Emperor Hui's half-brother) to overthrow Sima Jiong, believing that Sima Ai would fail; his plan was then to, in conjunction with Sima Ying, start a war against Sima Jiong. Once they were victorious, he would depose Emperor Hui and make Sima Ying the emperor, and then serve as Sima Ying's prime minister. In winter 302, Sima Yong declared his rebellion, and Sima Ying soon joined, despite opposition from his strategist Lu Zhi. Hearing that Sima Ai was part of the conspiracy as well, Sima Jiong made a preemptive strike against Sima Ai, but Sima Ai was prepared and entered the palace to control Emperor Hui. After a street battle, Sima Jiong's forces collapsed, and he was executed. Sima Ai became regent, although he submitted all important matters to Sima Ying, then at his stronghold of Yecheng (鄴城, in modern Handan, Hebei) for decision.

This ran counter to Sima Yong's plans. In fall 303, he persuaded Sima Ying to again join him against Sima Ai. While Sima Yong and Sima Ying had overwhelming force, their forces could not score a conclusive victory against Sima Ai. Sima Yong's forces were about to withdraw in spring 304 when Sima Yue the Prince of Donghai, the grandson of Sima Kui (a great-granduncle of Emperor Hui), believing that Sima Ai could not win this war, arrested him and delivered him to Sima Yong's general Zhang Fang, who executed Sima Ai cruelly by burning him to death. Sima Ying became in effective control of the government, but continued to control it remotely from Yecheng. Sima Yong was given additional powers, and later in 304 submitted a pre-arranged petition to have Sima Ying created crown prince.

Sima Ying, however, disappointed people who had high hopes for him. He put people he trusted in charge of the defenses of Luoyang, while remotely controlling the government from Yecheng. Eventually, the officials in Luoyang grew tired of the situation, and they rose under Sima Yue's command in summer 304. Sima Yue, with Emperor Hui accompanying him, then attacked Yecheng. Sima Ying, after some initial hesitation, battled Sima Yue's troops and defeated him, forcing him to flee and capturing Emperor Hui. He did not return Emperor Hui to Luoyang, but kept the emperor at Yecheng.

This gave Wang Jun (王浚), the commander of the forces in You Province (幽州, modern Beijing, Tianjin, and northern Hebei), with whom Sima Ying had prior disputes, an excuse to attack Sima Ying, and he did so, claiming that Sima Ying was improperly detaining Emperor Hui. Wang's forces were reinforced with ferocious Xianbei and Wuhuan soldiers, and Sima Ying's forces, in fear of their fighting abilities, collapsed, before they could be reinforced with Xiongnu forces under the command of Sima Ying's associate Liu Yuan. Sima Ying was forced to flee to Luoyang with Emperor Hui, now without troops to support him.

== As regent ==
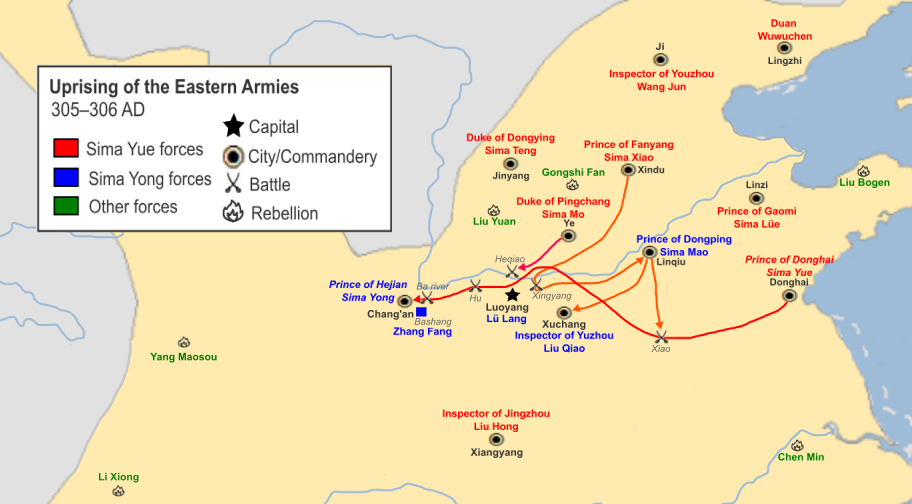
Uprising of the Eastern Armies, 305–306 AD.

Once Sima Ying arrived in Luoyang, he found the troops of his ally Sima Yong there, commanded by Zhang Fang. Instead of continuing to support Sima Ying, however, Sima Yong turned his back on Sima Ying and had him removed from his crown prince position, instead creating another half-brother of Emperor Hui, Sima Chi the Prince of Yuzhang, crown prince. Sima Ying was demoted back to being the Prince of Chengdu. Soon, Zhang forced Emperor Hui, Crown Prince Chi, and Sima Ying to move from Luoyang to Chang'an, safely under Sima Yong's control. Sima Yong became regent.

Sima Yong tried to appease possible opposing forces by promoting all of the major princes and warlords, but his promotions did not have the desired effect. In fall 305, Sima Yue declared yet another rebellion, this time against Sima Yong, claiming that Sima Yong had improperly forced Emperor Hui to move the capital. Various provincial governors and military commanders were forced to be on one side or the other. The war was initially inconclusive. In early 306, after a few victories by Sima Yue, Sima Yong became fearful, and he executed Zhang to seek peace; Sima Yue refused. By summer 306, Sima Yong was forced to abandon both Chang'an and Emperor Hui, and Sima Yue's forces welcomed Emperor Hui back to Luoyang on 28 June.

Sima Yong's troops soon fought back, however, and recaptured Chang'an for Sima Yong, but were unable to capture any other major city in the same region. Sima Yue then offered the high-level position of situ to Sima Yong. Sima Yong agreed to accept it and started to travel back to Luoyang. However, when he got to Xin'an (新安, near Luoyang), he was intercepted by Liang Chen (梁臣), a general under Sima Mo (司馬模; Prince of Nanyang and Sima Yue's younger brother) and strangled to death. His three sons were killed with him.
