= Timeline of the Jin dynasty (266–420) and the Sixteen Kingdoms (304–439) =

Western Jin dynasty in 280 AD

This is a timeline of the Jin dynasty (266–420) and the Sixteen Kingdoms (304–439).

== 260s ==
Year	Event
266	Sima Yan (Emperor Wu of Jin) declares himself emperor of the Jin dynasty

== 280s ==
Year	Event
280	Conquest of Wu by Jin: Sun Hao surrenders to Jin; so ends the Three Kingdoms period
284	30,000 Xiongnu submit and settle in Xihe (in Shanxi)
285	Du Yu, commentator of the Zuozhuan, dies
286	100,000 Xiongnu submit at Yongzhou
289	Murong Hui of Xianbei submits

== 290s ==
Year	Event
290	Emperor Wu of Jin dies and is succeeded by Sima Zhong (Emperor Hui of Jin) and Yang Jun assumes regency
290	Liu Yuan is appointed area commander-in-chief of the Five Regions of Xiongnu
291	War of the Eight Princes: Empress Jia Nanfeng kills Yang Jun, Sima Liang, and Sima Wei
295	Tuoba Luguan divides the Xianbei into three areas
296	The Di and Qiang in Qinzhou (秦州 and Yongzhou (雍州), in Shaanxi and Gansu, rebel; Qi Wannian of Di declares himself an emperor
296	Chouchi: Yang Maosou sets up Chouchi south of Tianshui
297	Tuoba Yituo of Xianbei begins to conquer the Western Regions
298	Floods strike Jingzhou (荊州), Yuzhou (豫州), Xuzhou (徐州), Yangzhou (揚州), and Jizhou (冀州) (the middle and lower Changjiang and Huai valleys). Refugees from Lueyang (略陽) and Tianshui (天水) drift into Hanzhong (漢中) (south Shaanxi).
299	Qi Wannian is killed

== 300s ==
Year	Event
300	War of the Eight Princes: Sima Lun kills Jia Nanfeng, Sima Yun, Shi Chong, and Pan Yue
301	War of the Eight Princes: Sima Lun declares himself emperor and gets killed by Sima Jiong, Sima Ying, and Sima Yong
301	Li Te rebels in Guanghan (northeast Sichuan)
302	War of the Eight Princes: Sima Ai kills Sima Jiong
303	Zhang Chang rebels in Jiangxia (江夏) (Yunmeng, Hubei) and sets up Qiu Chen as emperor
303	Lu Ji is killed
304	War of the Eight Princes: Sima Yue imprisons Sima Ai, who is later killed
304	Emperor Hui of Jin relocated to Chang'an
304	Han-Zhao: Liu Yuan of Xiongnu declares himself Prince of Han (漢)
304	Cheng-Han: Li Xiong creates the Ba Di state of Cheng-Han
305	Gongshi Fan, Ji Sang, and Shi Le rebel
305	Zuo Si dies
306	Chen Min declares himself Duke of Chu in the lower Changjiang valley
306	Liu Bogen and Wang Mi rebel
306	Sima Ying is killed
306	Gongshi Fan is defeated
306	Emperor Hui of Jin dies and is succeeded by Sima Chi (Emperor Huai of Jin), who moves back to Luoyang
306	Cheng-Han: Li Xiong declares himself emperor
307	Ji Sang and Shi Le sack Ye, killing more than 10,000 people
307	Sima Rui is in charge of military affairs in the south
307	Han-Zhao: Shi Le joins Liu Yuan
307	Murong Hui declares himself Great Chanyu
308	Han-Zhao: Liu Yuan takes Pingyang and declares himself emperor

== 310s ==
Year	Event
310	Han-Zhao: Liu Yao, Shi Le and Wang Mi invade Luoyang, Xuzhou, Yuzhou, and Yanzhou
310	Han-Zhao: Liu Yuan dies and his successor Liu He is killed by Liu Cong, who takes over
310	Fu Hong declares himself Duke of Lueyang
311	Han-Zhao: Sima Yue dies and his funeral procession is ambushed by Shi Le, who annihilates the Jin army
311	Disaster of Yongjia: Liu Yao and Wang Mi sack Luoyang and capture Emperor Huai of Jin
311	Han-Zhao: Liu Yao takes Chang'an
311	Han-Zhao: Wang Mi is killed by Shi Le
312	Han-Zhao: Jin retakes Chang'an after routing Liu Yao
312	Han-Zhao: Shi Le captures Xiangguo (襄國) (Xingtai, Hebei)
312	Han-Zhao: Liu Cong briefly takes Jinyang (southwest of Taiyuan, Shanxi) but is routed by Liu Kun
313	Emperor Huai of Jin is killed by Liu Cong and is succeeded by Sima Ye (Emperor Min of Jin)
313	Goguryeo takes Lelang Commandery
313	Tuoba Yilu names Shengle the northern capital and Pingcheng the southern capital
314	Former Liang: Zhang Gui dies and is succeeded by Zhang Shi
315	Dai: Tuoba Yilu becomes Prince of Dai
316	Han-Zhao: Emperor Min of Jin surrenders Chang'an to Liu Yao
317	Sima Rui declares himself Prince of Jin at Jiankang
318	Emperor Min of Jin is killed by Liu Cong and is succeeded by Sima Rui (Emperor Yuan of Jin)
318	Han-Zhao: Liu Cong dies and his successor Liu Can is killed by Xiongnu general Jin Zhun, and is succeeded by Liu Yao
319	Han-Zhao: Jin Zhun is killed
319	Han-Zhao: Liu Yao moves to Chang'an and renames his state Zhao
319	Han-Zhao: Fu Hong joins Han-Zhao
319	Later Zhao: Shi Le defeats Jin general Zu Ti at Xunyi and declares himself Prince of [Later] Zhao

== 320s ==
Year	Event
320	Han-Zhao: Juqu Zhi rebels and is defeated
321	Later Zhao: Shi Le takes control of Youzhou, Jizhou, and Bingzhou
322	Wang Dun rebels in Wuchang
322	Later Zhao: Shi Hu invades Xuzhou and Yanzhou
322	Emperor Yuan of Jin dies and is succeeded by Sima Shao (Emperor Ming of Jin)
322	Earliest archaeological evidence of a double stirrup
324	Wang Dun dies
325	Later Zhao: Shi Le takes Sizhou (司州), Xuzhou, and Yanzhou
325	Emperor Ming of Jin dies and is succeeded by Sima Yan (Emperor Cheng of Jin)
328	Later Zhao: Shi Le crosses the Huai River
329	Later Zhao: Shi Le takes Luoyang and kills Liu Yao while Shi Hu takes Chang'an

== 330s ==
Year	Event
330	Later Zhao: Shi Le declares himself emperor
330	Wei: Zhai Bin 翟斌 creates Zhai Wei 翟魏
333	Later Zhao: Shi Le dies and is succeeded by Shi Hong
334	Later Zhao: Shi Hu kills Shi Hong and usurps power
335	Later Zhao: Shi Hu moves the capital to Ye
337	Former Yan: Murong Huang declares himself Prince of [Former] Yan
338	Later Zhao: Shi Hu and Murong Huang defeat Tuhe of the Duan tribe

== 340s ==
Year	Event
342	Emperor Cheng of Jin dies and is succeeded by Sima Yue (Emperor Kang of Jin)
342	Former Yan: Murong Huang moves his capital to Longcheng and invaded Goguryeo, capturing 50,000 of its people
344	Former Yan: Murong Huang destroys the Yuwen tribe
344	Emperor Kang of Jin dies and is succeeded by Sima Dan (Emperor Mu of Jin)
345	Later Zhao: Shi Hu starts mass mobilization for the construction of the Luoyang Palace
346	Former Liang: Zhang Jun takes Yanqi
347	Huan Wen of Jin conquers Cheng-Han and takes Chengdu
347	Later Zhao: Shi Hu builds the Hanlin Park using 160,000 laborers, thousands of whom die
349	Later Zhao: Shi Hu dies and Ran Min carries out genocide against the Jie people
349	Chu Pou of Jin carries out a failed northern expedition

== 350s ==
Year	Event
350	Ran Min declares himself emperor
350	Fu Hong dies and is succeeded by Fu Jian who takes Chang'an
350	Duan Qi: Duan Kan declares himself Prince of Qi in Guanggu
351	Former Qin: Fu Jian declares himself Heavenly King of [Former] Qin
352	Former Qin: Fu Jian declares himself emperor
352	Wei-Xianbei war: Murong Jun kills Ran Min, takes Yecheng, and declares himself emperor at Jizhou
353	Yin Hao of Jin leads a failed northern expedition
354	Huan Wen's expeditions: Huan Wen defeats Former Qin at Guanzhong but withdraws
355	Former Qin: Fu Jian dies and is succeeded by Fu Sheng
356	Zhou Cheng and Yao Xiang of the Qiang people lay siege to Luoyang but are defeated by Huan Wen
356	Former Yan: Kills Duan Kan
357	Former Qin: Fu Sheng is killed and usurped by Fu Jian
357	Former Yan: Murong Jun moves his capital to Yecheng
359	Xie Wan of Jin leads a failed northern expedition

== 360s ==
Year	Event
361	Huan Wen's expeditions: Huan Wen defeats Former Yan and takes Xuchang
361	Emperor Mu of Jin dies and is succeeded by Sima Pi (Emperor Ai of Jin)
363	Ge Hong dies
364	Former Yan: Murong Wei invades Henan and takes Xuchang
365	Emperor Ai of Jin dies and is succeeded by Sima Yi (Emperor Fei of Jin)
365	Former Yan: Murong Wei takes Luoyang
369	Huan Wen's expeditions: Huan Wen is defeated by Murong Chui at Xiangyi (襄邑) (Suixian, Henan)

== 370s ==
Year	Event
370	Former Qin: Qin troops conquer Former Yan
371	Former Qin: Conquers Chouchi
371	Huan Wen deposes Emperor Fei of Jin and enthrones Sima Yu (Emperor Jianwen of Jin)
372	Emperor Jianwen of Jin dies and is succeeded by Sima Yao (Emperor Xiaowu of Jin)
373	Huan Wen dies and Xie An dominates the court
375	Former Qin: Fu Jian bans Daoism
376	Former Qin: Qin conquers Former Liang and Dai
379	Former Qin: Qin takes Xiangyang from Jin

== 380s ==
Year	Event
383	Battle of Fei River: Qin army is defeated by Xie Shi and Xie Xuan
383	Former Qin: Lü Guang subjugates Qiuci
384	Later Qin: Yao Chang of Qiang declares himself Prince of Qin
384	Later Yan: Murong Chui rebels and declares himself Prince of [Later] Yan
384	Western Yan: Murong Hong declares himself Prince of Jibei and after his death Murong Chong takes over
384	Jin retakes territory in Henan from Former Qin
385	Western Yan: Murong Chong takes Chang'an from Qin
385	Western Qin: Founded by Qifu Guoren
385	Former Qin: Fu Jian is killed by Yao Chang
385	Chouchi: Revived
386	Northern Wei: The Tuoba state is revived
386	Later Qin: Yao Chang declares himself emperor
387	Later Liang: Lü Guang declares himself Duke of Jiuquan

== 390s ==
Year	Event
393	Wei: Conquered by Later Yan
394	Later Qin: Later Qin conquers Former Qin
394	Later Yan: Conquers Western Yan
395	Northern Wei: Tuoba Gui defeats Later Yan at Canhepi (east-northeast of Liangcheng, Inner Mongolia)
396	Northern Wei: Tuoba Gui takes Bingzhou from Later Yan
396	Emperor Xiaowu of Jin dies and is succeeded by Sima Dezong (Emperor An of Jin)
397	Southern Liang: Tufa Wugu declares himself Prince of Xiping
397	Northern Liang: Duan Ye declares himself Duke of Jiankang in Zhangye
398	Northern Wei: Tuoba Gui moves his capital to Pingcheng
399	Northern Wei: Tuoba Gui declares himself emperor
399	Sun En revolts
399	Faxian leaves for India

== 400s ==
Year	Event
400	Western Liang: Li Gao declares himself Duke of Liang in Dunhuang
400	Western Qin: Submits to Southern Liang and then Later Qin
400	Southern Yan: Murong De declares himself emperor in Guanggu
401	Northern Liang: Juqu Mengxun kills Duan Ye and declares himself Duke of Zhangye
402	Huan Xuan sacks Jiankang and Sun En dies, but his lieutenant Lu Xun takes over
403	Later Liang: Surrenders to Later Qin
404	Huan Xuan declares himself emperor and dies the same year
405	Qiao Zong declares himself Prince of Chengdu
407	Xia: Helian Bobo declares himself Heavenly King
407	Northern Yan: Gao Yun is set up as heavenly king and replaces Later Yan
409	Western Qin: Revived

== 410s ==
Year	Event
410	Liu Yu's expeditions: Liu Yu conquers Southern Yan
411	Rebel Lu Xun dies
412	Faxian returns from India
413	Jin recovers Sichuan and Qiao Zong commits suicide
414	Western Qin: Conquers Southern Liang
416	Jin takes Luoyang from Later Qin
416	Huiyuan dies
417	Liu Yu's expeditions: Jin conquers Later Qin and Liu Yu takes Chang'an
418	Jin troops retreat from Chang'an
418	Xia (Sixteen Kingdoms): Helian Bobo takes Chang'an
419	Xia (Sixteen Kingdoms): Helian Bobo leaves Chang'an

== 420s ==
Year	Event
420	Liu Yu (Emperor Wu of Liu Song) replaces the Jin dynasty with the Song dynasty
421	Northern Liang: Juqu Mengxun conquers Western Liang
422	Emperor Wu of Liu Song dies and is succeeded by Liu Yifu, Emperor Shao of Liu Song
423	Kou Qianzhi sets up the Celestial Master at Pingcheng
424	Emperor Shao of Liu Song is deposed and succeeded by Liu Yilong (Emperor Wen of Liu Song)
426	Northern Wei: Attacks Xia
427	Northern Wei: Takes Chang'an and sacks the Xia capital, Tongwan
428	Xia: Retakes Chang'an

== 430s ==
Year	Event
430	Northern Wei: Takes Luoyang from Liu Song
430	Western Qin: Abandons Yuanchuan and Fuhan to the Tuyuhun and relocates to Pingliang and Anding
431	Xia: Conquers Western Qin and are in turn conquered by the Tuyuhun
433	Xie Lingyun is killed
434	Northern Wei: Enters a marriage alliance with the Rouran
434	Song retakes Hanzhong from Chouchi
435	Northern Wei: Attacks Northern Yan
436	Northern Wei: Conquers Northern Yan, whose sovereign Feng Hong flees to Goguryeo
439	Northern Wei: Conquers Northern Liang; so ends the Sixteen Kingdoms

== Gallery ==
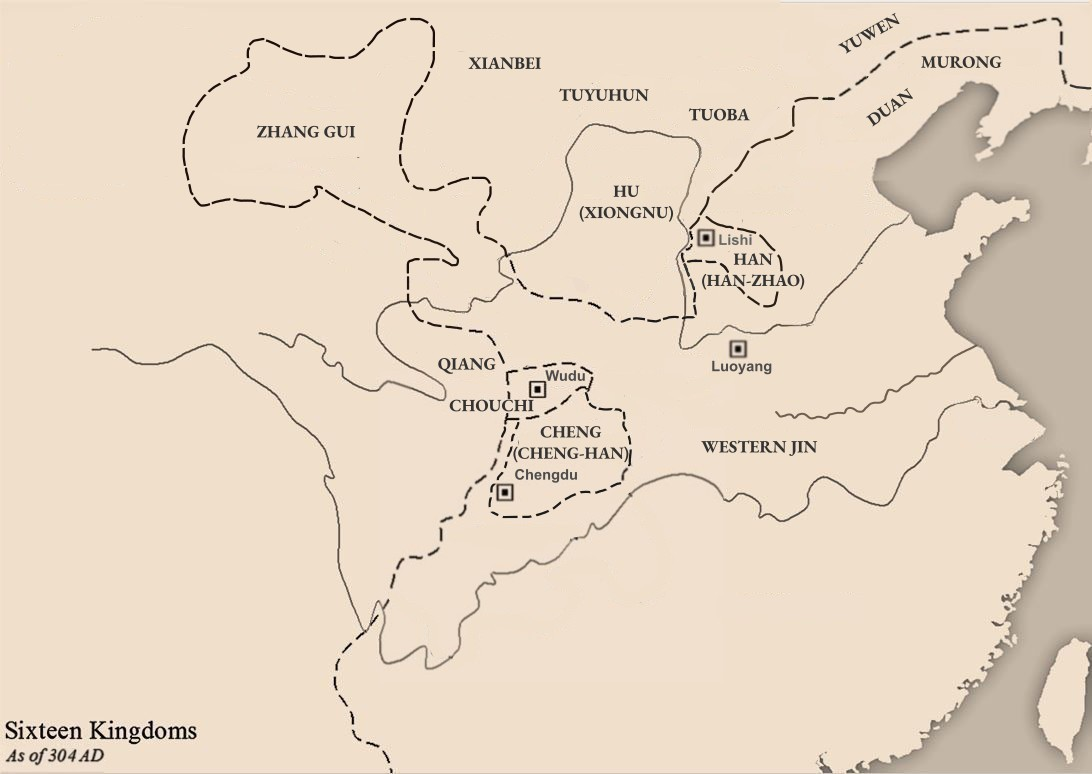
304 AD

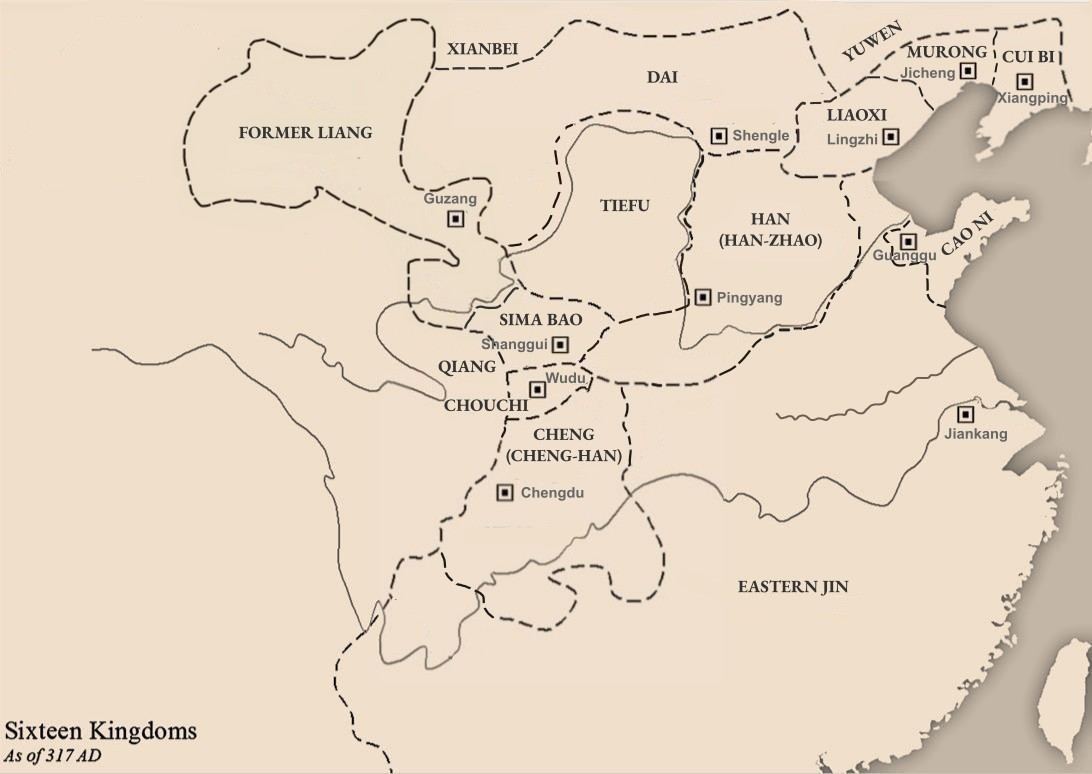
317 AD

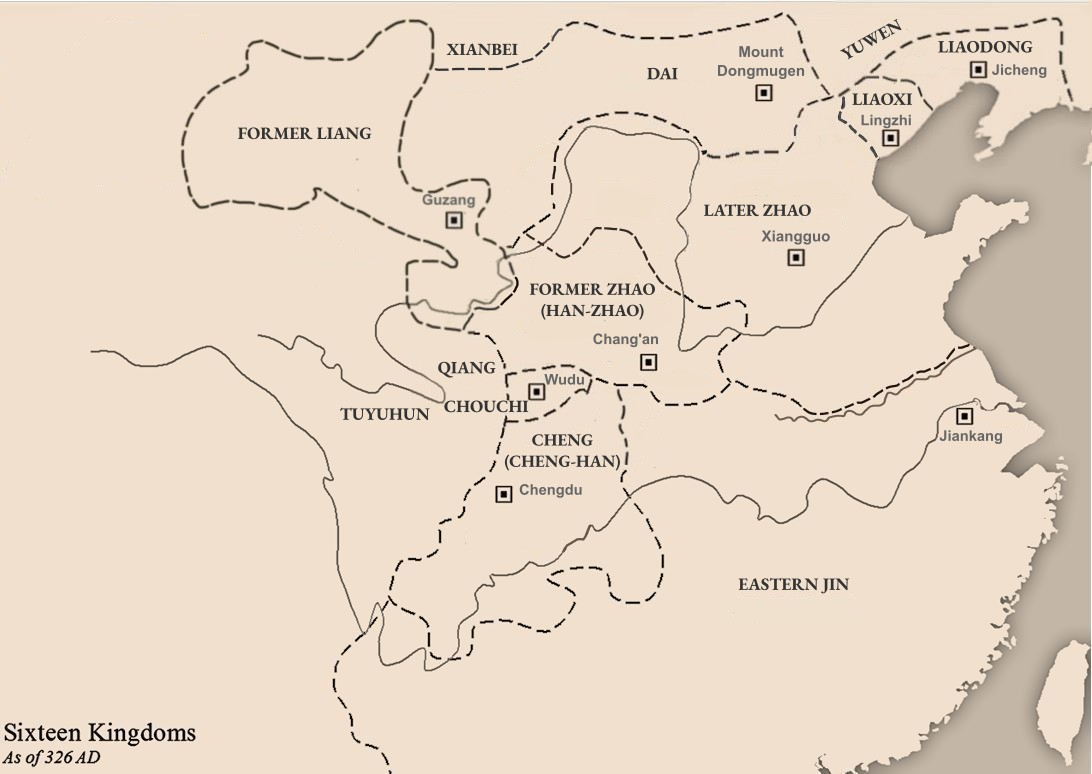
326 AD

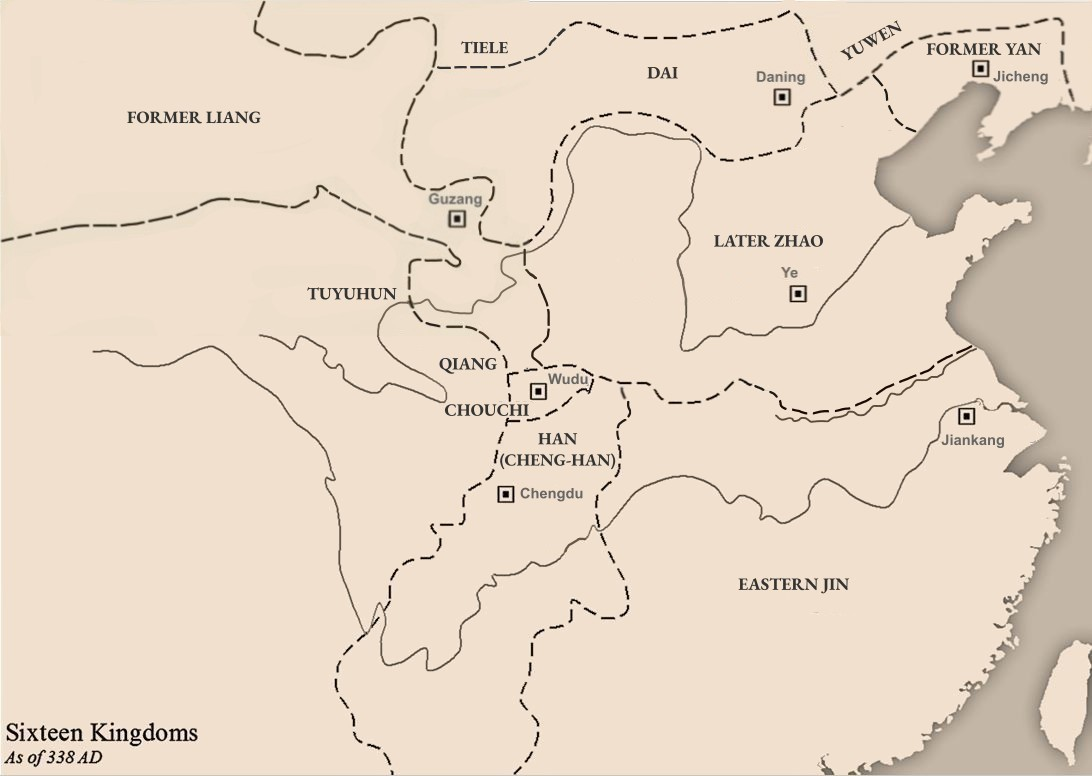
338 AD

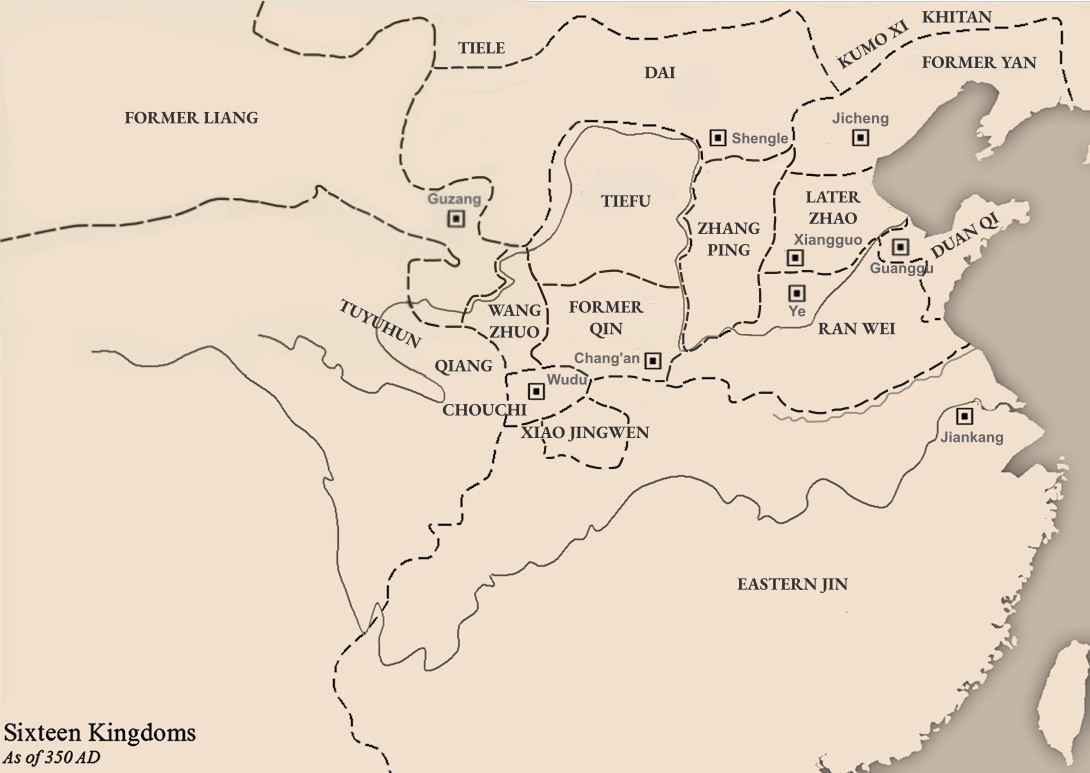
350 AD

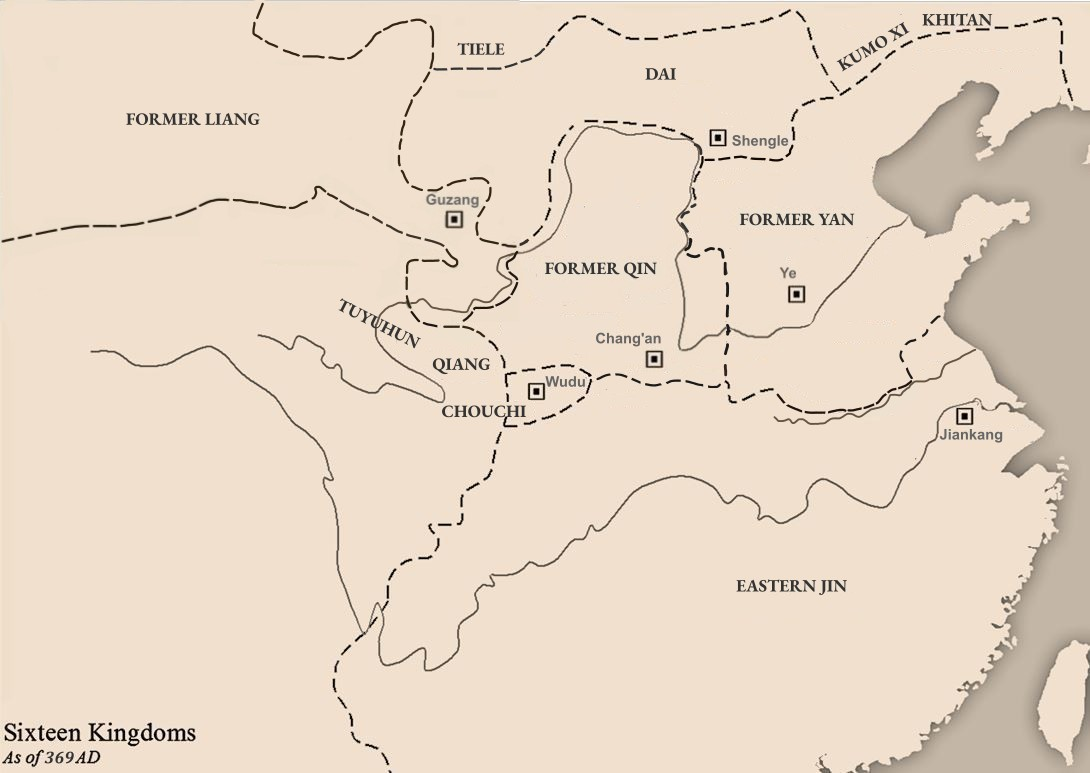
369 AD

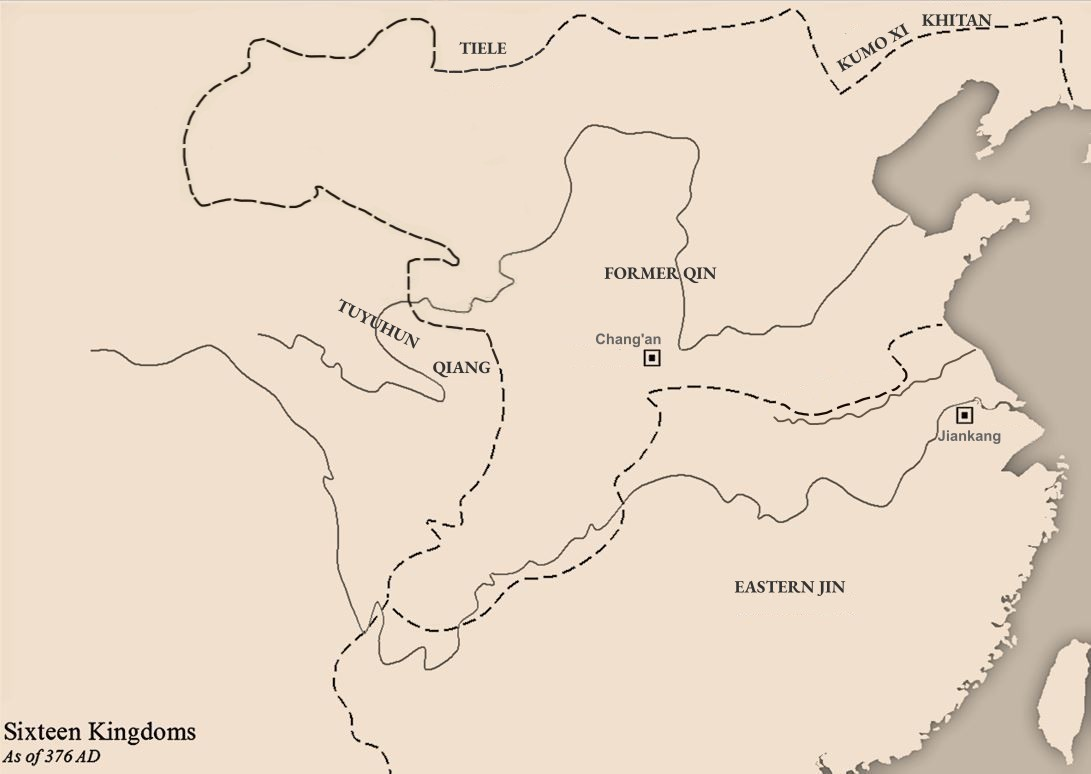
376 AD

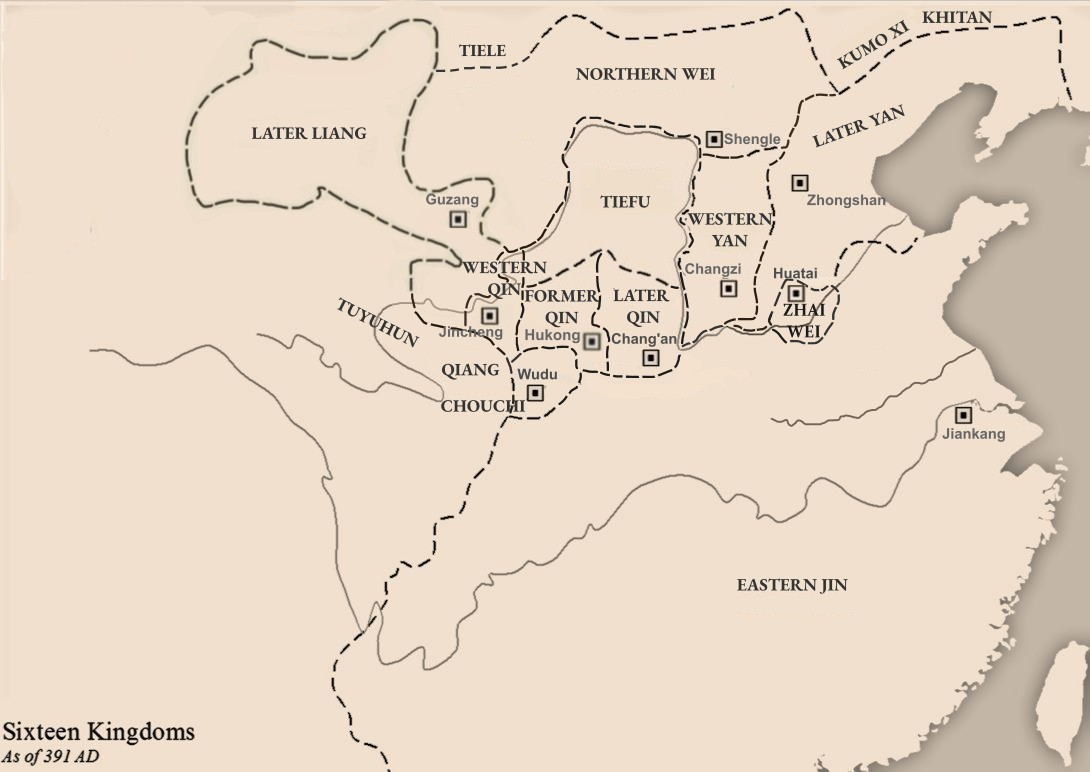
391 AD

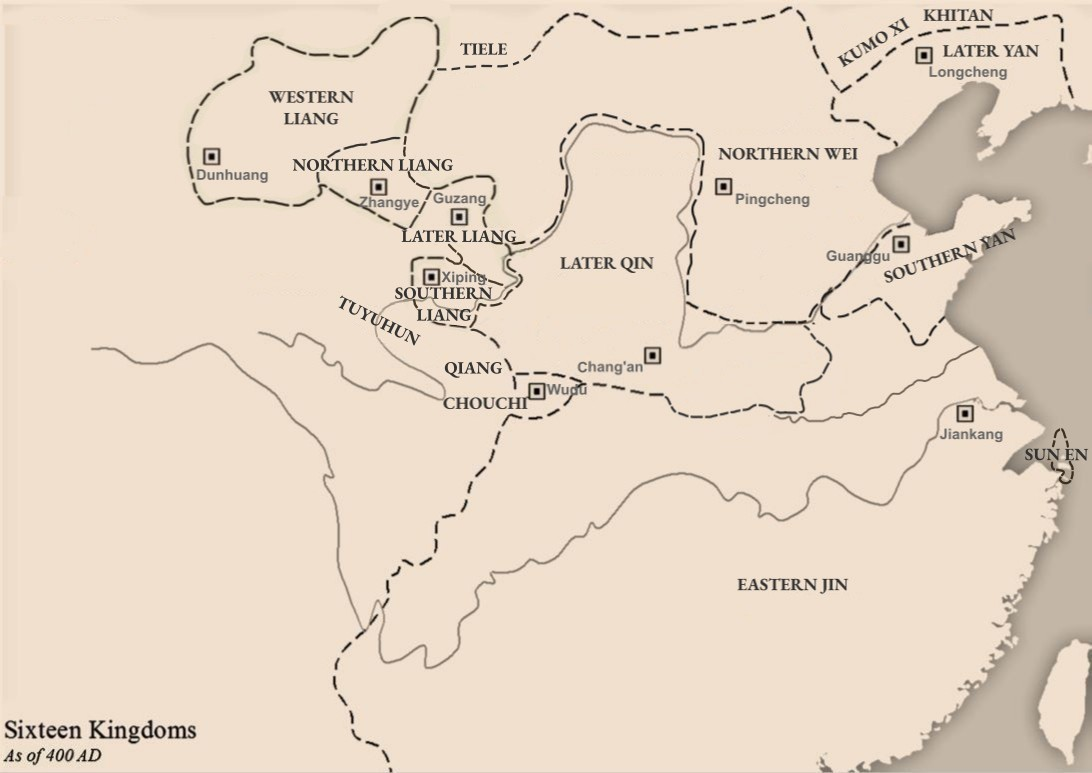
400 AD

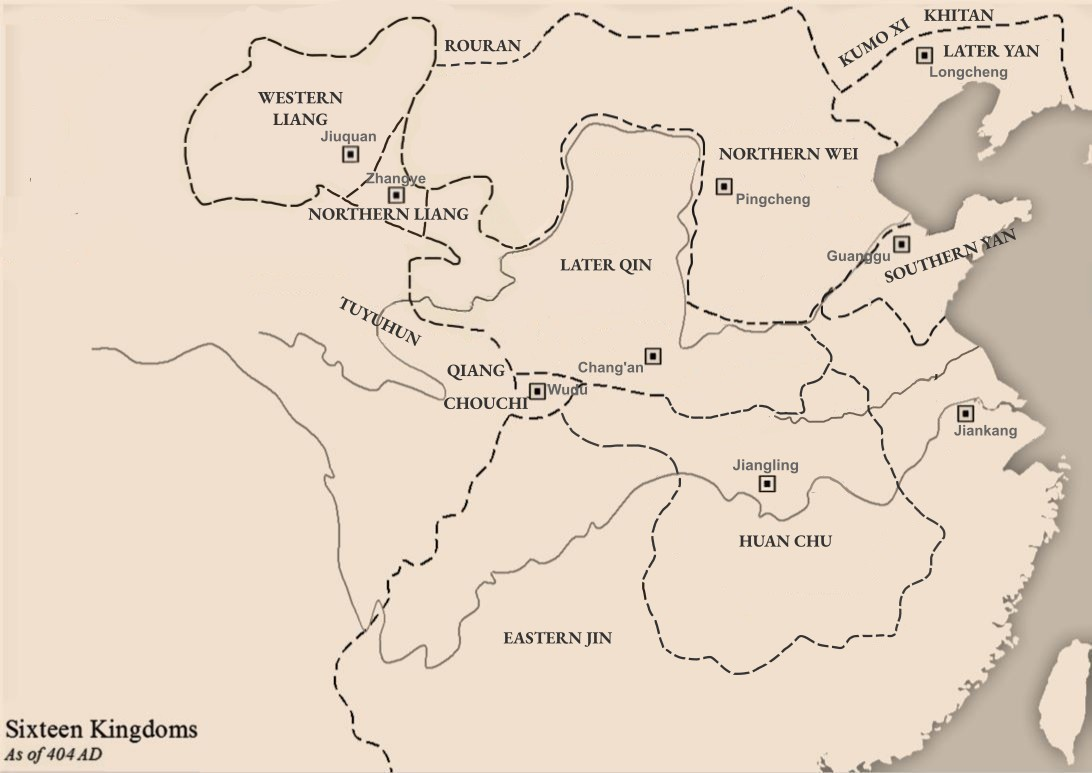
404 AD

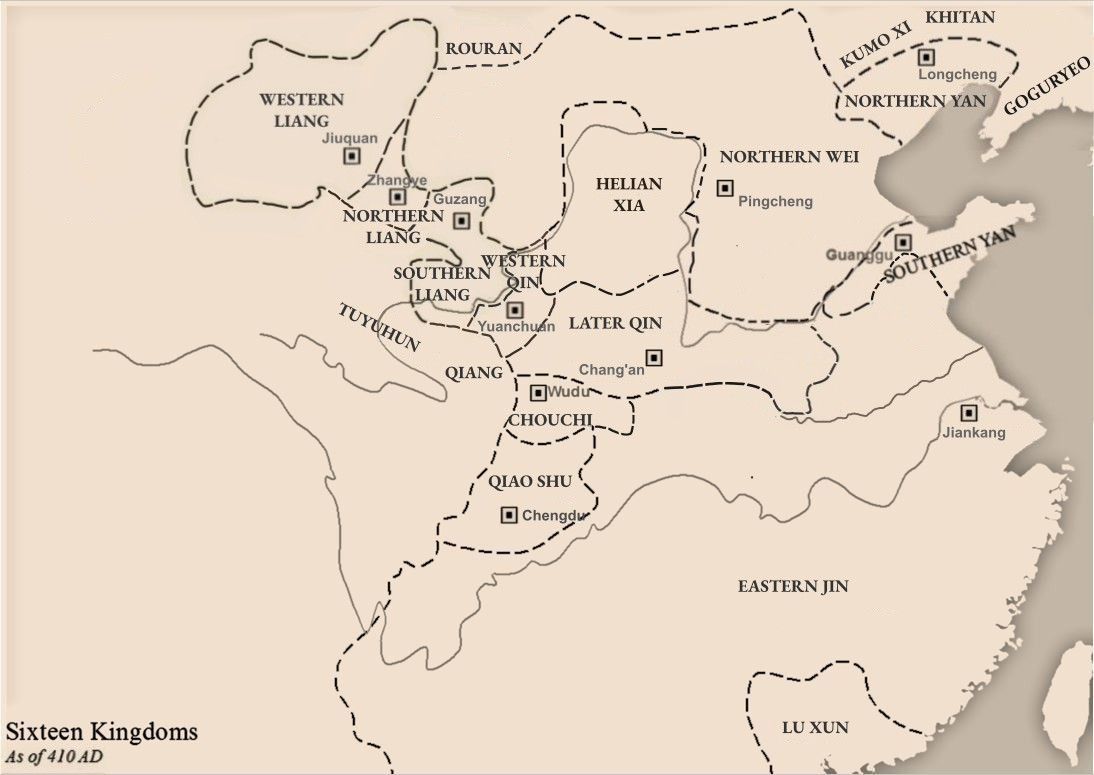
410 AD

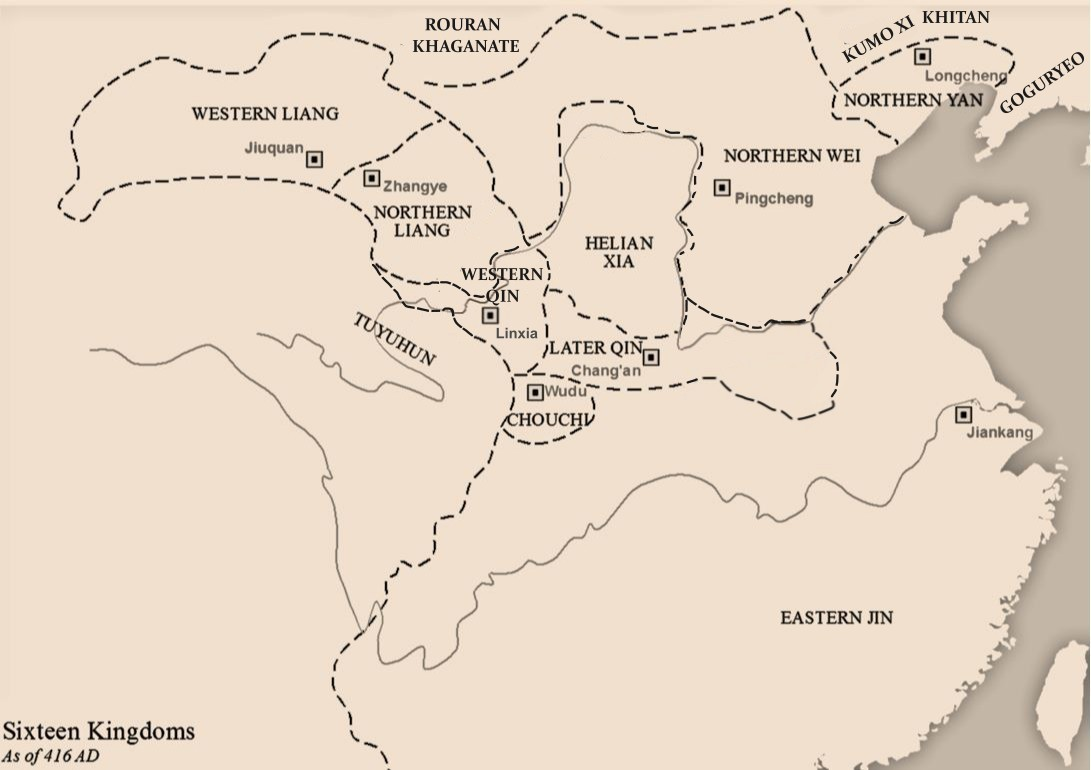
416 AD

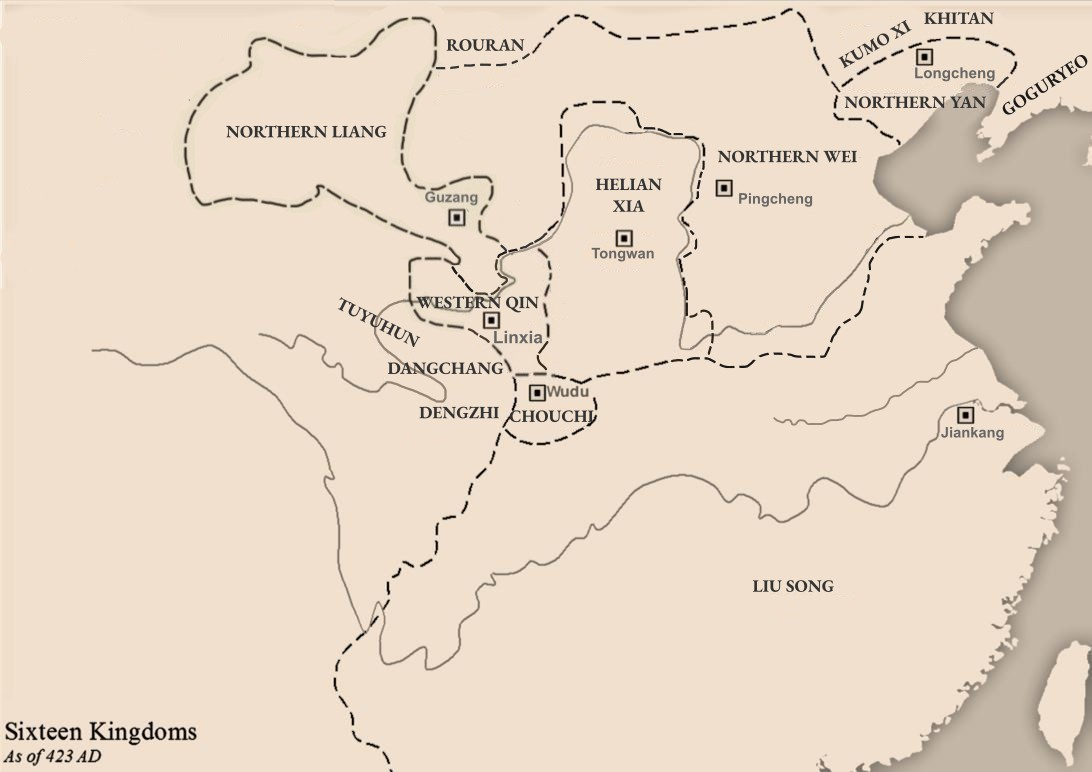
423 AD

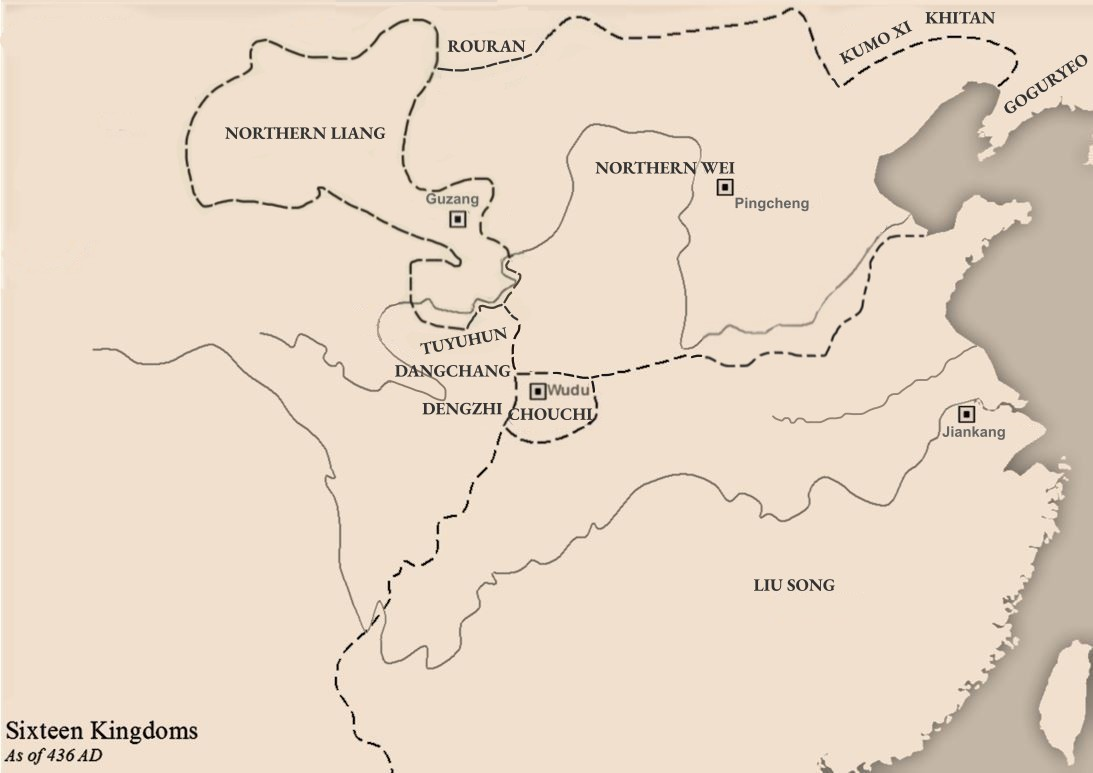
436 AD

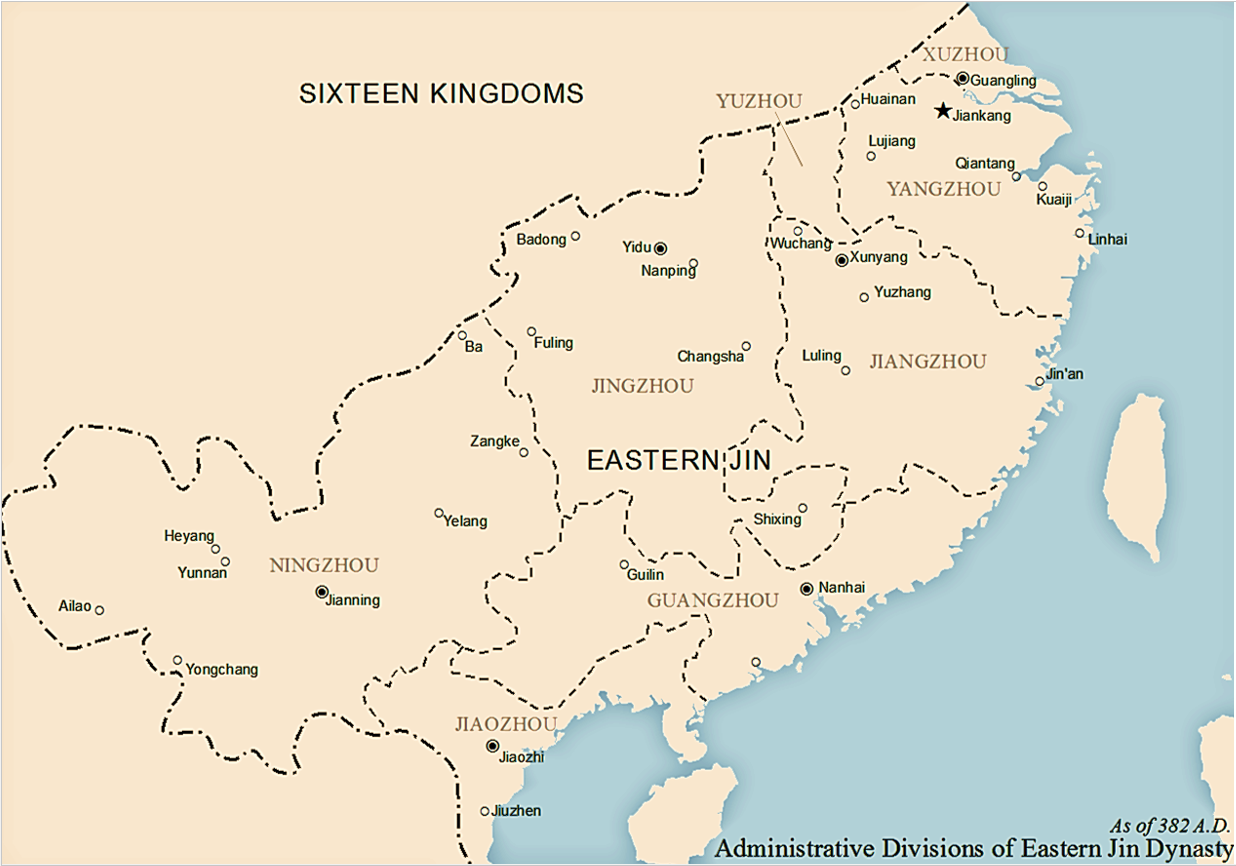
Eastern Jin, 382

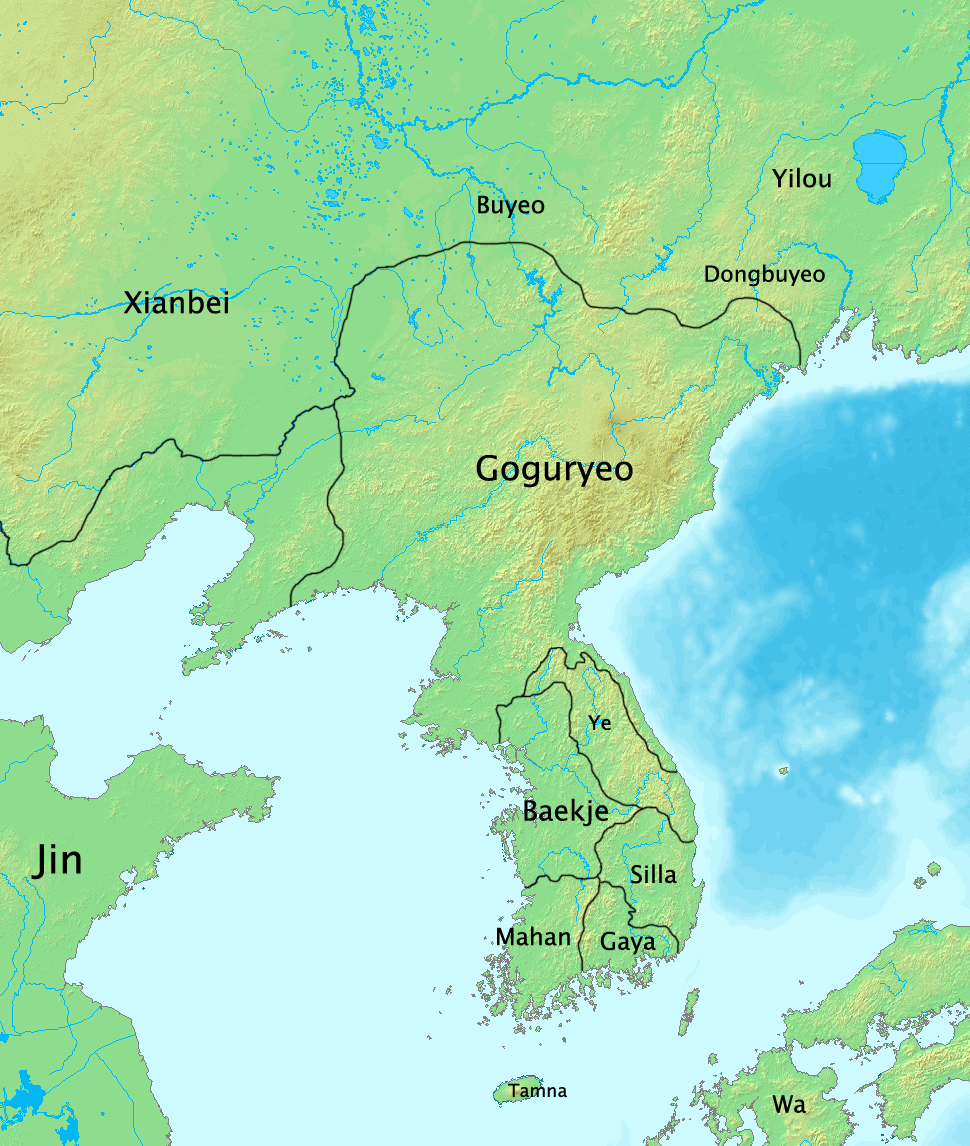
Korea in 315 AD

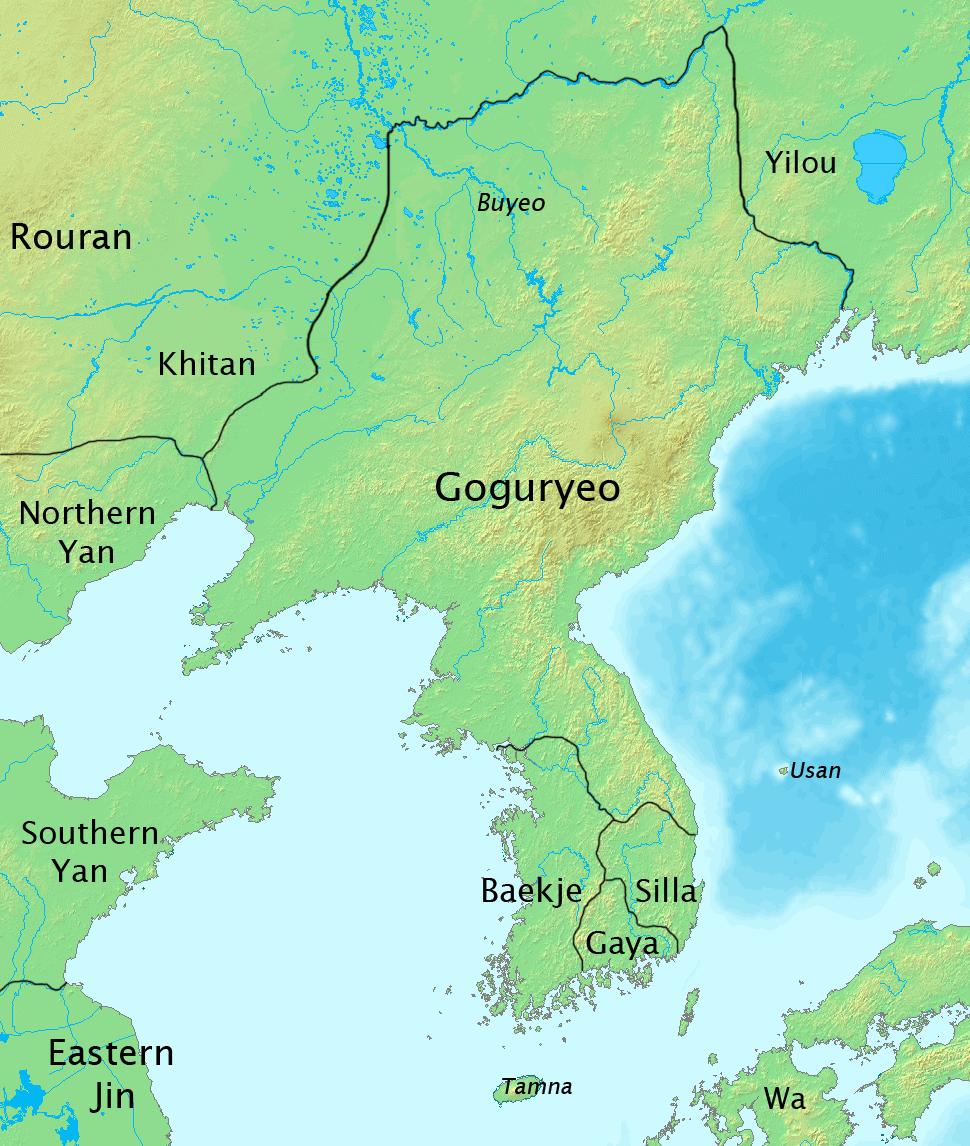
Korea in 410 AD

== Bibliography ==
- Crespigny, Rafe (2007), A Biographical Dictionary of Later Han to the Three Kingdoms (23-220 AD), Brill
- Shin, Michael D. (2014), Korean History in Maps, Cambridge University Press
- Twitchett, Denis (2008), The Cambridge History of China 1, Cambridge University Press
- Xiong, Victor Cunrui (2009), Historical Dictionary of Medieval China, United States of America: Scarecrow Press, Inc., ISBN 978-0810860537
