= Beigong Chun =

Jin and Han-Zhao general (died 318)

- 北宮純

Protector under the Inspector of Liangzhou (涼州刺史督護)
- In office ?–311
- Monarch: Emperor Huai of Jin

Personal details
- Born: Unknown
- Died: c.September 318 Linfen, Shanxi

Beigong Chun (died c.September 318) was a military general of the Jin dynasty (266–420) and Han-Zhao dynasty during the Sixteen Kingdoms period. He was a subordinate of the Inspector of Liang province, Zhang Gui who led cavalry from Liang to help lift the siege of the Jin capital, Luoyang by Han-Zhao forces in 308 and 309. After the Disaster of Yongjia, he surrendered to Han and became an official before he was killed during Jin Zhun's rebellion in 318.

== Life ==
Nothing is known regarding Beigong Chun's background except that he served as a Protector under the Inspector of Liang province, Zhang Gui, who took the office in 301.

In 308, the bandit, Wang Mi submitted to the Han-Zhao dynasty and wreaked havoc in Qing and Xu provinces. Wang Mi was even able to capture the city of Xuchang, sending shockwaves to the Jin capital, Luoyang. With Wang Mi advancing towards Luoyang, Zhang Gui sent Beigong Chun with his provincial army to aid the Jin defenders. Beigong Chun was able to link up with the city commanders, Wang Yan and Wang Bin (王斌) when Wang Mi arrived at the Jinyang Gate (津陽門; westernmost gate on the southern wall). The Jin forces went out to engage the rebels, during which Beigong Chun led more than a hundred warriors to break the rebels' formation, contributing to a great defeat for Wang Mi. Wang Mi retreated eastward and was pursued by the Jin general, Wang Bing (王秉). Meanwhile, Beigong Chun and others marched to Hedong Commandery where they defeated the Han general, Liu Cong, who had come to support Wang Mi.

In 309, the emperor of Han, Liu Yuan ordered Liu Cong, Liu Yao and Wang Mi to attack Luoyang with 50,000 soldiers, so Liu Yuan once again sent Beigong Chun to defend the capital. During the siege, while Liu Cong was camping at the Ximing Gates (西明門; the southmost end of the western wall), Beigong Chun launched a night raid on his camp with more than a thousand warriors, killing Liu Cong's general, Huyan Hao (呼延顥). The Han forces were eventually ordered to withdraw a few weeks later, and Luoyang was once again saved.

Beigong Chun and the generals and soldiers of Liang province were praised as heroes around this time, and a song was composed to commemorate their deeds:

涼州大馬，橫行天下。

The great horses of Liangzhou,

running wild across the world;

涼州鴟苕，寇賊消；

The mighty owls of Liangzhou,

making bandits disappear;

鴟苕翩翩，怖殺人。

See the mighty owls swoop,

fearsome as they kill.

In 311, Liu Cong, now Emperor of Han, sent Huyan Yan to capture Luoyang and ordered Wang Mi, Liu Yao and Shi Le to join him. Zhang Gui sent Beigong Chun and his other generals with 5,000 of his troops to once more rescue the capital. However, this time, Luoyang was practically defenseless and suffering from a famine, while the Jin imperial army had been annihilated by Shi Le. Luoyang thus fell and Emperor Huai of Jin was captured by Han forces in the Disaster of Yongjia. Beigong Chun decided to retreat to Chang'an, which was under the control of the Prince of Nanyang, Sima Mo.

In October of that year, Han forces led by Liu Can and Zhao Ran also descended upon Chang'an. After Zhao Ran defeated Sima Mo at Tong Pass, Beigong Chun took his troops from Chang'an to surrender to Han. Sima Mo was killed and Chang'an came under Han's control, after which Beigong Chun was sent to the Han capital, Pingyang.

After his capture, Beigong Chun worked for the Han government as a Master of Writing. In 318, after Liu Cong's death, the consort kin, Jin Zhun launched a coup against the new emperor, Liu Can and slaughtered the Han aristocracy in Pingyang. Beigong Chun gathered the Han Chinese within Pingyang and attempted to defend themselves in the Eastern Palace (東宮). However, Jin Zhun's cousin, Jin Kang (靳康), attacked them and had them all killed.
