= Battle of Ningping =

Battle between the Han-Zhao and Western Jin (311)

- Part of Upheaval of the Five Barbarians
Date	Between 23 April and 5 May 311
Location	Shenqiu County, Henan
Result	Han victory; destruction of the Jin imperial army

Belligerents
Han-Zhao	Western Jin

Commanders and leaders
Shi Le	Wang Yan (executed); Sima Fan (executed)

Strength
Unknown	100,000

Casualties and losses
Unknown; likely light	Wiped out

The Battle of Ningping City (simplified Chinese: 宁平城之战; traditional Chinese: 寧平城之戰; pinyin: Níngpíngchéng zhī zhàn) also known as the Battle of Kuxian (simplified Chinese: 苦县之战; traditional Chinese: 苦縣之戰; pinyin: Kǔxiàn zhī zhàn), was fought between Han-Zhao forces led by Shi Le against the state of Western Jin in April or May 311. The battle, which preceded the Disaster of Yongjia, concluded in a Han victory with the destruction of the Jin imperial army in northern China.

== Prelude ==
On 22 December 310, the Prince of Donghai and regent of the Jin Empire, Sima Yue, due to his suspicion of Emperor Huai of Jin and wanting to fight the armies of Han in open battle, led the 40,000 strong imperial army out from the capital, Luoyang to camp at Xuchang. This decision was in spite of the Emperor's objection, who feared that the capital would be defenseless to attacks. Yue selected a few of his inner circle to keep close watch on the Emperor while he was away, which included his advisor He Lun, the Qihuo general Li Yun, Yue's wife Lady Pei and his eldest son Sima Pi. He brought with him many of the government's top ministers and generals to Xuchang, before shifting his camp east to Xiang county (in present-day Shenqiu County, Henan). Eventually, the imperial army swelled to 100,000.

After years of growing animosity, Emperor Huai could no longer tolerate Sima Yue's actions and allied himself with the Inspector of Qing province, Gou Xi. While Jin continued to fight against the growing threat of Han, the two secretly exchanged letters with one another, and eventually, Huai sent an edict to Gou Xi ordering him to campaign against Sima Yue. Yue's scouts intercepted the edict, but he was reportedly so overwhelmed by stress by the discovery that he became deathly ill. He entrusted the minister, Wang Yan with his important affairs before dying on 23 April 311.

The officials at Xiang were unsure of how to proceed. With Sima Pi at Luoyang, they needed a temporary leader and initially elected Wang Yan, but he refused. Their second candidate, Sima Fan (son of Sima Wei, Prince Yin of Chu), also turned down the responsibility. In the end, they decided that they should first hold a funeral at his fief in Donghai to the east before figuring out their next move. However, their situation was soon known to the Han general, Shi Le, who, just a month prior, had captured Xuchang with his forces.

== The battle ==
Between 23 April and 5 May, Shi Le pursued the funeral procession with his light cavalry, eventually catching up with them at Ningping city in Ku county (in modern day Luyi County, Henan). The Jin camp sent out the general Qian Duan with troops to oppose Shi, but Qian was killed and his army dispersed. Shi Le then sent his cavalry to surround the remainder of the Jin army and fire arrows at them. The Jin soldiers and officers were mowed down with nowhere to escape, and their bodies piled up atop one another. His general, Wang Zhang (the younger brother of Wang Mi) was even reported to have had the surviving soldiers burnt alive and their flesh consumed. In the end, Wang Yan, Sima Fan and many other nobles and officials were captured by Shi Le.

== Aftermath ==
=== Mass execution of prisoners ===
The prisoners were brought to Shi Le's tent for questioning in regards to the situation in Jin. When it was Wang Yan's turn, he explained the reasons for Jin's decline while refusing to take accountability. Shi Le enjoyed their conversations for the next several days, but their relationship turned sour after Wang Yan claimed that he never wanted to be an official and persuaded him to declare himself Emperor. Shi Le scolded him by saying, "Your fame extends over all the four seas, and since your youth you have occupied high positions... How can you claim to have taken no part in the affairs of the world? Indeed it is your fault that the empire is defeated and destroyed!"

Shi Le scheduled Wang Yan and the rest of the prisoners, including members of the Jin imperial family, for execution on the night of 5 May. That night, he instructed his men to push down a wall and crush the prisoners to death. He also broke open Sima Yue's coffin and burnt his body, declaring "This is the man who brought suffering to all under Heaven. In the name of justice for this world, I burn his bones as a message to Heaven and Earth."

=== Battle of Weicang ===
When news of Sima Yue's death first reached Luoyang, He Lun and Li Yun abandoned Emperor Huai and fled east with Sima Pi, Lady Pei and the rest of his subordinates. Many of the inhabitants hastily went to join them, with fighting and looting breaking out within the city. However, their group only made it as far as Weicang (northwest of present-day Yanling County, Henan), where they were met with Shi Le who had just won at Ningping. They were defeated, and a further 48 princes of the imperial family were killed. He Lun and Li Yun escaped to Xiapi and Guangzong respectively; Lady Pei was initially captured, but she too eventually escaped and went to the Prince of Langya, Sima Rui at Jiankang.

With the destruction of the imperial army in the north, Luoyang was practically left desolate and defenseless. Gou Xi attempted to welcome Emperor Huai to his base at Cangyuan (in present-day Kaifeng, Henan), but the Emperor was set back by his officials who were reluctant to leave their homes behind. Meanwhile, Han forces elsewhere saw an opportunity to capture Luoyang once and for all, setting the stage for what would become known as the Disaster of Yongjia.
