= Qihuo =

Refugee group during the Jin dynasty (266–420) and Sixteen Kingdoms period

The Qihuo (Chinese: 乞活; pinyin: Qǐhuó; Wade–Giles: Ch'i-huo; lit. 'Begging-for-life') were a refugee group during the Jin dynasty and Sixteen Kingdoms period. Originating from Bingzhou in modern-day Shanxi, the Qihuo branched out to parts of Hebei and Henan during the Upheaval of the Five Barbarians, where they acted as semi-autonomous militia forces for the Jin dynasty. Among the various refugee groups of their time, the Qihuo lasted the longest, as even after a century since the fall of the Western Jin, their descendants continued to invoke the group's name and provide military services.

== History ==
=== Origins ===
At the start of the 4th century, northern China was ravaged by both the War of the Eight Princes and the Upheaval of the Five Barbarians. In addition to the perpetual state of war, famines and natural disasters were also frequent occurrences in the north, displacing many of the civil population. These refugees would form groups to better defend themselves against threats, and either fled southwards where the situation was more stable or opted to remain in the north by occupying fortified settlements (塢堡; wubao) and other strategic locations.

Bing province in modern-day Shanxi during this period was especially affected by the famine, and also by a Xiongnu rebellion which saw the formation of the Han-Zhao dynasty in 304. In 306, the provincial inspector, Sima Teng was transferred to Ji province to serve as the Chief Controller for the city of Ye. He allowed many of the generals in Bing, along with more than 10,000 officials, to follow him to Ji where they could find for food. These generals formed a group which they dubbed "Qihuo" or "Begging-for-Life"; key members around this time include Tian Zhen (田甄), his brother Tian Lan (田蘭), Ren Zhi (任祉), Qi Ji (祁濟), Li Yun (李惲), and Bo Sheng (薄盛). The Qihuo leaders were mostly Han Chinese, with Bo Sheng being a notable exception as he was a "Wuhuan".

=== Rise to power ===
In 307, Sima Teng was killed in Ye by the rebel forces of Ji Sang and Shi Le, who then laid siege on the former Inspector of Shi Xian (石鮮) at Leling (樂陵; present-day Yangxin County, Shandong). Seeking to avenge their former master, the Qihuo rallied 50,000 troops to rescue Shi Xian, although he was eventually killed in battle, and a contingent of the Qihuo led by Tian Yin (田禋) was defeated by Shi Le. The rebels were later defeated by the Jin generals, Gou Xi and Ding Shao (丁邵). As Ji Sang was fleeing, Tian Zhen and the Qihuo ambushed him at Leling, where they killed him.

For their contributions, the Grand Tutor and Prince of Donghai, Sima Yue appointed Tian Zhen and Tian Lan as the Administrator of Ji Commandery and Administrator of Julu Commandery respectively. When Tian Zhen requested for Wei Commandery instead, Sima Yue rejected him, which caused him to resent the prince. In 308, Sima Yue moved to Xingyang where he summoned Tian Zhen and the others. When they refused to respond, he sent his general Liu Wang (劉望) to campaign against them. Tian Zhen fled after Liu Wang's forces crossed the Yellow River, while Tian Lan was beheaded by Li Yun and Bo Sheng who then surrendered. Tian Zhen, Ren Zhi and Qi Ji all abandoned their armies and fled to Shangdang Commandery.

The surrendered Qihuo largely kept their autonomy, but were willing to lend their military to the Jin. In 309, Shi Le, now a general of Han-Zhao, attacked Zhongqiu County (中丘縣; west of present-day Neiqiu County, Hebei) and destroyed the Qihuo branch led by Tian Yin and She Ting (赦亭). Later that same year, Li Yun, Bo Sheng and the others aided Sima Yue in lifting the siege of the Jin capital, Luoyang from Han forces led by Liu Cong and Wang Mi. As Liu Cong retreated, the Qihuo managed to defeat Wang Mi at Xinji (新汲, in modern Fugou County, Henan). In 310, Li Yun, Chen Wu (陳午) and the others attempted to relive Jin forces at Huai County (懷縣; in present-day Wuzhi County, Henan), but was routed by the Han.

When Sima Yue departed from Luoyang with the imperial army in 310, Li Yun, serving as his Dragon Soaring General, was one of his confidants who he left behind to monitor the near-defenseless capital and Emperor Huai of Jin. After relations broke down between Sima Yue and his general, Gou Xi, who was conspiring with the emperor to depose the prince, Chen Wu was one of the Qihuo who sided with the latter.

=== Guangzong branch ===
In April 311, Sima Yue died while he was camping at Xiang County (項縣; in present-day Shenqiu County, Henan), and the Jin imperial army was annihilated by Shi Le at the Battle of Ningping in May. When news of Yue's death reached Luoyang, Li Yun and the rest of Yue's allies panicked. They brought with them Yue's concubine, Lady Pei and his son, Sima Pi (司馬毗) to flee east out of Luoyang. Many of the city inhabitants followed them, and widespread violence and looting ensued. As the group was passing through Weicang (洧倉; northwest of present-day Yanling County, Henan), they were attacked by Shi Le and defeated. The members of the imperial family were slaughtered, and Li Yun, after killing his own wife and children, fled to Guangzong County (廣宗縣; southeast of present-day Guangzong County, Hebei) with the remaining Qihuo.

Not long after the defeat at Weicang, Luoyang and Emperor Huai were lost to Han forces in the Disaster of Yongjia in July. The Jin Inspector of You Province, Wang Jun installed a new crown prince of Jin and began handing out appointments. Among them, Li Yun was appointed the Inspector of Qing province despite having little real power over the region. In 313, Shi Le attacked and killed Li Yun at the city of Shangbai (上白; also southeast east of modern Guangzong County) in Guangzong. While he initially considered killing the surrendered Qihuo soldiers, he quickly changed his mind after he found that his old friend, Guo Jing, was one of their generals. He had the troops pardoned and placed them under Guo Jing's command.

Following Li Yun's death, Wang Jun had him replaced with Bo Sheng. However, when Shi Le attacked and killed Wang Jun's Inspector of Yan province, Tian Hui later that same year, Bo Sheng captured Jin's Administrator of Bohai, Liu Ji (劉既) and brought with him 5,000 troops to surrender to Shi Le. Wang Jun was eventually defeated by Shi Le in 314.

=== Chenliu branch ===
South of the Yellow River at Chenliu Commandery (陳留郡, roughly modern Kaifeng, Henan), Chen Wu acted as a subordinate to Gou Xi's ally, Wang Zan (王讚), but by 311, both Gou Xi and Wang Zan were captured and executed by Shi Le. Chen Wu continued to hold out at Pengguan (蓬關; south of present-day Kaifeng, Henan) and Feize (肥澤; in Kaifeng). Although he briefly surrendered to Shi Le, he soon rebelled against him at Junyi County (浚儀, in Kaifeng) in 313. In 316, Shi Le sent his general, Shi Hu to attack the Qihuo at Liangcheng (梁城; in Kaifeng), but he was defeated by Wang Ping (王平).

Chen Wu died in 319, and before his death, he warned his people to never serve the "Hu" people. His son, Chen Chite (陳赤特), was still young, so his generals, Feng Chong (馮寵) and Li Tou (李頭) elected his cousin, Chen Chuan (陳川) (Note: In Zizhi Tongjian, Chen Chuan was identified as a wuzhu.) to assist Chite. During Zu Ti's northern expedition that same year, Chen Chuan sent Li Tou to assist him against a rival warlord, Fan Ya (樊雅) at Qiao. However, he became apprehensive of Li Tou, who he thought spoke too highly of Zu Ti, and had him executed. Feng Chong promptly led 400 people to surrender to Zu Ti, angering Chen Chuan even further. He plundered the commanderies of Yu province but was defeated in an ambush laid by Zu Ti. He then surrendered Junyi to Shi Le, who had recently established the Later Zhao dynasty, and was relocated to Xiangguo with 5,000 households, though another sources states they were relocated to Guangzong.

=== Later history ===
From hereafter, the Qihuo became less active but continued to make sporadic appearances in history as they maintained their presence in Hebei and Henan for roughly a century. In 349, the Qihuo in Guangzong gave protection to the Later Zhao dynasty's Minister of Works, Li Nong who was attacked by the Zhao's imperial army. (Note: A civil war broke out in Later Zhao after Shi Hu's death.) Ran Min, the founder of the Ran Wei who brought upon Later Zhao's demise, was a descendant of the Qihuo, as his father, Ran Zhan was once a subordinate under Chen Chuan.

In c.June 354, (Note: The 5th month of the 10th year of the Yong'he era of the reign of Emperor Mu of Jin corresponds to 7 Jun to 6 Jul 354 in the Julian calendar.) Guo Chang (郭敞) (Note: In Zizhi Tongjian, Guo Chang was identified as a refugee from Jiangxi.) and other Qihuo generals north of the Yangzi river rebelled against Jin, capturing the Interior Minister of Chenliu, Liu Shi (劉仕) and surrendering the commandery to the Qiang warlord, Yao Xiang.

During the reign of Fu Jian of the Former Qin dynasty (357–385), one member of the Qihuo, Xia Mo (夏默), was appointed as the Gentleman of the Left Garrison.

In 370, there were several hundred Qihuo soldiers under the Jin general, Yuan Zhen when he rebelled at Shouchun, but after the rebellion's defeat in 371, the Jin commander, Huan Wen had them all executed.

In 386, a Qihuo general in Henan, Huang Huai (黃淮), proclaimed himself Inspector of Bing province and allied with the Dingling rebel, Zhai Liao to attack Changshe (長社; present-day Changge, Henan) with thousands of people. However, he was defeated and killed by Jin forces.

The Qihuo's last appearance in history was in 419. When many of the imperial Jin family fled to the south of the Yellow River, the general, Shao Ping (邵平) led more than a thousand Qihuo soldiers from Bing province to welcome Sima Wenrong (司馬文榮) at the south of Jinyong (金鏞; northwest of Luoyang, Henan). After Wenrong was assassinated by a relative, Sima Shunming (司馬順明), who occupied Lingyun Terrace (陵雲台) west of Luoyang, Shao Ping acclaimed Shunming as the new leader. Shunming later surrendered to the Northern Wei dynasty.
