= Ji Sang =

Jin dynasty rebel (died 308)

- 汲桑

Grand General (大將軍) (Self-appointed)
- In office 307 – 308
- Monarch: Emperor Hui of Jin/Emperor Huai of Jin

Personal details
- Born: c.280s
- Died: 11 January 308

Ji Sang (c.280s - 11 January 308) was a Chinese rebel of the Western Jin dynasty. During his days as a shepherd, he befriended a Jie slave whom he would name Shi Le (the future Emperor Ming of Later Zhao). The two raised a personal army and later joined Sima Ying's retainer, Gongshi Fan (公師藩), who rose up to avenge the prince after his removal. Following Gongshi Fan's death, Ji Sang and Shi Le continued on their own, sacking the city of Ye in the process. They were finally defeated by the Jin general Gou Xi, and Ji Sang was assassinated by the Qihuo in 308.

== Life ==
Ji Sang was either from Beiqiu County (southeast of present-day Boxing County, Shandong) in Qinghe Commandery or Yangping Commandery (陽平; present-day Qingfeng County, Henan). Then in his 20s, he was widely admired at the time for his strengths, as it was said he was capable of lifting extremely heavy weights and his breathing could be heard from great distances.

He worked in a group of horse shepherds that were operating next to the household of Shi Huan (師懽) in Chiping County. In 304, he befriended one of Shi Huan's slaves, Bei (㔨) (or Fule (匐勒)), a Jie man who later went on to establish one of the most pivotal states of the Sixteen Kingdoms, Later Zhao. After Bei was released in 305, the two men agreed to become bandits, recruiting hundreds of men under their wing. Ji Sang also gave Bei his more commonly known name, Shi Le.

That same year, the Prince of Chengdu, Sima Ying, was removed from his position of crown prince. His general Gongshi Fan, rose up against the Prince of Donghai, Sima Yue, so Ji Sang and Shi Le joined him. Gongshi Fan was killed the following year in 306, after he was defeated by Sima Yue's general Gou Xi. Ji Sang fled back to the pasture he once worked at together with Shi Le, assembling new men to fight for their cause and plundering the region. He declared himself Grand General, stating his intentions to avenge the now deceased Sima Ying. He also made Shi Le his General Who Routs the Caitiffs.

Ji Sang resumed his fight with Jin in early 307, when he attacked the city of Ye. Ji Sang first defeated the general Feng Song (馮嵩) before continuing to advance to the city. The Prince of Xincai and commander of Ye, Sima Teng, fled the city, but was killed by Ji Sang's general, Li Feng (李豐) in June or July. After entering the city, Ji Sang dug up the coffin of Sima Ying and placed it in a cart. It is said that after acquiring the coffin, Ji Sang would talk to it as if he was consulting Sima Ying for advice. Ji Sang sacked the city and left it to burn for ten days before leaving.

Ji Sang marched south of the Yellow River and began threatening Yanzhou. Sima Yue, now regent to Emperor Huai of Jin, worried greatly and sent his generals, Gou Xi and Wang Zan (王讚) to subdue Ji Sang. Ji Sang and Shi Le were locked in a stalemate with Gou Xi for months at Pingyuan and Yangping (陽平; in present-day Shen County, Shandong). On 14 September, Gou Xi routed Ji Sang at Dongwuyang (東武陽; in present-day Shen County, Shandong), forcing him to retreat to Qingyuan (清淵; in present-day Linxi County, Hebei). Gou Xi pursued him and defeated him again, killing many of his followers. Ji Sang and Shi Le took the decision to flee to Liu Yuan's state of Han-Zhao, but along the way, they were intercepted and beaten by Ding Shao (丁邵).

After their defeat to Ding Shao, Ji Sang and Shi Le were separated from each other. Ji Sang fled to his pasture while Shi Le fled to Leping (樂平; in present-day Jinzhong, Shanxi) to join Liu Yuan. Although Shi Le managed to reach Liu Yuan, Ji Sang was not so lucky. A group loyal to Sima Teng called the Qihuo were angry about Ji Sang's killing of their late master. They raised their troops and killed Ji Sang at Leling (樂陵; present-day Yangxin County, Shandong) on 11 January 308, finally ending the conflict between Sima Yue and Sima Ying's retainers.

== Anecdote ==
A story tells that on a hot summer in one year, Ji Sang wrapped himself in pelts and asked someone to fan him. When he no longer felt cool, he had the fanner executed. A song titled "Song of Bingzhou (并州歌)" was composed and sung by soldiers following his death which referenced this event:

士為將軍何可羞,

An infantryman made himself a general, how shameful!

六月重茵被衲裘,

In the sixth month layering on clothing and donning leopard hide,

不識寒暑斷他頭。

Unable to distinguish cold from heat he severed a man's head.

熊兒田蘭為報仇,
The heroic lad Tian Lan enacted retribution on the foe,

中夜斬首謝并州。

In the middle of the night [he] beheaded [him] to recompense Bingzhou!”
