= Emperor Xiaohuai =

Emperor Xiaohuai may refer to:

- Liu Shan (207–271), emperor of Shu Han
- Emperor Huai of Jin (284–313)
