= Jianzhong =

Jianzhong may refer to:

- Jianzhong (780–783), era name used by Emperor Dezong of Tang
- Jianzhong, Guizhou, town in Weng'an County, Guizhou, China
- Jianzhong, Hebei, town in Linxi County, Hebei, China
- Jianzhong, Sichuan, town in Santai County, Sichuan, China

== See also ==
- Jianzhongjingguo (1101), era name used by Emperor Huizong of Song
