= Linxi =

Linxi may refer to:

- Albert Leung, an award-winning cantopop lyricist

== China ==
=== Counties ===
- Linxi County, Hebei (临西县)
- Linxi County, Inner Mongolia (林西县)

=== Towns ===
- Linxi, Anhui (临溪镇), in Jixi County
- Linxi, Xingtai (临西镇), seat of Linxi County, Hebei
- Linxi, Tangshan (林西镇), in Yutian County, Hebei
