= Gou Xi =

Jin dynasty general (died 311)

- 苟晞

Inspector of Yanzhou (兗州刺史)
- In office 304 – 311
- Monarchs: Emperor Hui of Jin; Emperor Huai of Jin

Grand General (大將軍)
- In office 311 – 311
- Monarch: Emperor Huai of Jin

Grand Commander (大都督)
- In office 311 – 311
- Monarch: Emperor Huai of Jin

Personal details
- Born: Unknown Shanyang County, Shaanxi
- Died: c.November 311
- Relations: Gou Chun (brother)
- Occupation: General and politician
- Courtesy name: Daojiang (道將)
- Peerage: Marquis of Dongping (東平侯); Duke of Dongping (東平公)
- Nickname: Count Butcher (屠伯)

Gou Xi (died c.November 311 (Note: The annals of Emperor Huai in Book of Jin recorded that Gou Xi and Sima Duan were captured by Shi Le on 7 October 311 (guihai day of the 9th month of the 5th year of the Yong'jia era). Vol.87 of Zizhi Tongjian dated Gou's capture to the 9th month of that year (without indicating a specific day), and Gou's death to the 10th month, which corresponds to 29 Oct to 26 Nov 311 in the Julian calendar. In Tongjian, the entry for Gou's death is placed after the entry for Wang Mi's death.)), courtesy name Daojiang, was a Chinese military commander of the Western Jin Dynasty. He came to prominence as a general under the Prince of Donghai, Sima Yue, after he quelled the rebellions of Gongshi Fan (公師藩), Ji Sang and Shi Le. Sima Yue initially valued Gou Xi, but after Gou Xi was constantly antagonized by Yue, their relationship broke down in 310. Gou Xi plotted with Emperor Huai of Jin to depose Yue as regent, which caused Yue to die of stress shortly after, and Gou Xi being instated to the positions of Grand General and Grand Commander. However, their victory was short-lived due to the Disaster of Yongjia, which saw Emperor Huai's and Luoyang’s capture at the hands of Han-Zhao forces in 311. Later that year, Gou Xi was captured and then executed by Shi Le.

== War of the Eight Princes and suppressing Sima Ying's loyalists ==
=== Early career ===
Gou Xi hailed from Shanyang County in Henei Commandery and was of humble origins. He was first employed under Shi Jian. In the early 290s, Shi Jian recommended Gou to Sima Yue (Note: Gou Xi's biography in Book of Jin recorded that Sima Yue was already Prince of Donghai at this point, while the annals of Emperor Hui in the same work recorded that Shi Jian died on 12 February 294 (1st (ding'you) day of the 1st month of the 4th year of the Yuan'kang era). Thus, Gou Xi first joined Sima Yue between October 291 and February 294.) to serve as his General Secretary and Prefect of Yangping. Following the fall of Sima Lun in May 301, Gou Xi went to serve the Grand General Sima Jiong. After Jiong was killed by Sima Ai in January 303, Gou Xi was removed from the government for a brief period before Ai brought Gou Xi back to work under him. In 304, Gou Xi participated in Sima Yue's campaign against Sima Ying which ended in defeat for Yue at Dangyin (蕩陰; in present-day Anyang, Henan). Gou Xi was captured, but after Sima Ying was lost to Wang Jun that same year, Gou Xi escaped to Sima Yue's cousin, Sima Xiao (司馬虓), (Note: Sima Yue and Sima Xiao had the same grandfather, Sima Kui, who was a younger brother of Sima Yi.) who appointed him Inspector of Yanzhou.

=== Defeating Gongshi Fan and Ji Sang ===
By February 305, Sima Ying had been removed from his position as Crown Younger Prince by Sima Yong. The people of Hebei still supported Ying at this point and were angered by the decision. Because of this, former generals of Ying led by Gongshi Fan rebelled in the region, attacking many local counties and commanderies before making their way to Yecheng. Gou Xi through Sima Xiao’s order reinforced the city and turned away the rebels. In 306, Gou Xi’s army killed Gongshi Fan while he and his soldiers were trying to cross the Yellow River from Baima (白馬; near present-day Hua County, Henan).

However, two of Gongshi Fan's followers, Ji Sang and Shi Le, survived and fled to the pastures to raise their own army. In 307, claiming of wanting to avenge Sima Ying, they sacked Yecheng, killed the city's commander Sima Teng, and stole the coffin of Sima Ying (who died in 306) before invading Yanzhou. Sima Yue tasked Gou Xi and Wang Zan (王讚) in defeating the rebels. Gou Xi and Ji Sang and Shi Le's forces were locked in a stalemate for several months at Pingyuan and Yangping (陽平; in present-day Shen County, Shandong) while Sima Yue provided Gou Xi with support from Guandu (官渡; northeast of present-day Zhongmu County, Henan). On 14 September, Gou Xi finally landed a decisive victory over Ji Sang at Dongwuyang County (東武陽; in present-day Shen County, Shandong), forcing Ji Sang and Shi Le to fall back to Qingyuan County (清淵; in present-day Linxi County, Hebei). Gou Xi pursued the duo and broke through eight ramparts, killing more than ten thousand of the rebels. The pair decided to flee to Liu Yuan's state of Han-Zhao, but were forced to split up after they were intercepted and routed by Ding Shao (丁紹) along the way. Shi Le eventually found his way to Liu Yuan while Ji Sang was killed by the Qihuo group.

Gou Xi's feats in defeating Gongshi Fan, Ji Sang and Shi Le made him highly revered by the populace of his time. Many compared him to the ancient generals Han Xin and Bai Qi. By the time Ji Sang was defeated, Sima Yue had already established himself as Jin's paramount leader from his civil war with Sima Yong. As reward for quelling the rebellions, Sima Yue made Gou Xi General Who Nurtures The Army and Chief Controller in Qingzhou and Yanzhou.

== During Sima Yue's regency ==
=== Fall out with Sima Yue ===
In Yanzhou, Gou Xi was said to have administered well while enforcing strict laws over the provinces. Sima Yue and Gou Xi were both initially on good terms to the point that they were described as close as brothers whenever they were in court. However, their relationship began to crack when, at the advice of Pan Tao (潘滔), Sima Yue appointed himself the Governor and acting Chief Controller of Yanzhou while moving Gou Xi to positions in Qingzhou. Sima Yue and Pan Tao both saw Yanzhou as a strategically important province and did not trust Gou Xi in holding it. When Gou Xi arrived in Qingzhou to assume his posts, he immediately implemented excessively strict laws and oversaw many executions each day, earning him the nickname 'Count Butcher (屠伯)'. In 307, the Administrator of Dunqiu (頓丘, in present-day Qingfeng County, Henan) Wei Zhi (魏植), rebelled in Yanzhou, but was quickly defeated by Gou Xi. During his absence, Gou Xi left his brother, Gou Chun (苟纯), in charge of Qingzhou, and Gou Chun carried out more executions than his brother had.

At the time, the powerful bandit, Wang Mi was terrorizing Yanzhou and Qingzhou. After Wang Mi defeated Sima Yue's general Ju Xian (鞠羡), Gou Xi attacked Wang Mi and routed him, dispersing his troops. However, Wang Mi returned with more momentum in 308 to pillage Qingzhou, Xuzhou, Yanzhou and Yuzhou. This time, Gou Xi was unable to defeat him. Wang Mi eventually looted the Xuchang and tried to capture Luoyang but, fortunately for Jin, he was turned back by Wang Yan.

While Gou Xi and Sima Yue's relationship deteriorated, Gou Xi was constantly slandered to Sima Yue by Pan Tao and Yue's other advisors. In 310, Gou Xi became furious about this issue and sent a petition to Yue asking him to behead the slanderers, but Yue refused. This was the breaking point for Sima Yue and Gou Xi, as shortly after, Gou Xi began sending proclamations in his provinces alleging and denouncing Yue for his offences and calling for a campaign against him. Meanwhile, Emperor Huai of Jin, who hated Sima Yue for abusing his power, decided to reach out to Gou Xi and collaborate with him, which Gou Xi agreed to.

=== Alliance with Emperor Huai ===
Emperor Huai's first edict to him was to put down Wang Mi and his subordinate Cao Ni, who were now generals of Han-Zhao, as they were threatening the Luoyang region again. Gou Xi did so, but had to return to Qingzhou when Cao Ni broke into Langye. Gou Xi defeated Cao Ni several times, but in January 311, Gou Xi conceded a devastating loss to Cao Ni at Linzi due to strong winds blowing dust and obstructing his army's vision. Gou Xi fled to Gaoping in the middle of the night while many of his soldiers surrendered to Cao Ni. At Gaoping, Gou Xi gathered new troops and rebuilt his army.

Soon after, Emperor Huai secretly wrote an edict and sent it to Gou Xi ordering him to campaign against Sima Yue. However, Yue had previously noticed that Emperor Huai and Gou Xi were exchanging letters frequently, and this time he sent his cavalry to intercept Emperor Huai's envoys. Upon knowing the content of the edict, Sima Yue denounced Gou Xi and sent Yang Mao (楊瑁) and Pei Dun (裴盾; Yue's brother-in-law) to campaign against him. Gou Xi in response sent his soldiers to capture Pan Tao. Pan Tao escaped, but his colleagues Liu Zeng (劉曾) and Cheng Yan (程延) were executed by Gou Xi. Overly stressed with the situation at hand, Yue soon died of illness.

== Disaster of Yongjia and death ==
With Sima Yue's death in April 311, Emperor Huai appointed Gou Xi the Grand General, Grand Commander, and Chief Controller of Qingzhou, Xuzhou, Yanzhou, Yuzhou, Jingzhou, and Yangzhou, giving him very significant power over the state's military. Gou Xi wrote a petition to the emperor asking him to move the capital over to Cangyuan (倉垣, in present-day Kaifeng, Henan) in Yanzhou. Gou Xi even sent his official, Liu Hui (劉會), with boats, 500 guards and grains to escort the Emperor from Luoyang. Emperor Huai wanted to go, but later refused at the behest of his ministers who did not want to leave their property behind. Luoyang was in a dire situation at this point due to an ongoing famine and the Han-Zhao threat, but Emperor Huai faced a number of difficulties in trying to leave the capital. In the end, Han-Zhao forces captured Luoyang as well as the Emperor himself in July 311; many Jin officials and princes, including Emperor Huai's crown prince Sima Quan, were killed.

Emperor Huai's surviving nephew, Sima Duan (司馬端; brother of Sima Quan and Sima Tan), fled to Cangyuan, where Gou Xi proclaimed him as the new crown prince and moved his base to Mengcheng. In his final days, Gou Xi grew very cruel and indulgent. His advisors Yan Heng (閻亨) and Ming Yu (明預) criticized him for this, but Gou executed the former and ignored the latter. Because of this, Gou Xi alienated himself from his supporters. Shi Le, now a general of Han-Zhao, captured Wang Zan at Yangxia (陽夏; present-day Taikang County, Henan) and pressed on to Mengcheng where he defeated and captured Gou Xi and Sima Duan in October. Shi Le placed a lock around Gou Xi's neck and made him his Marshal of the Left. Just a month later, Gou Xi plotted with Wang Zan to assassinate Shi Le, but the plan was discovered, and Shi Le put the two of them as well as Gou Chun to death.
