= You Ziyuan =

4th century Han Zhao general and minister

- 游子遠

Grand Minister Over the Masses (大司徒)
- In office 320 – 326
- Monarch: Liu Yao

Personal details
- Born: Unknown Dali County, Shaanxi
- Died: Unknown

You Ziyuan (fl. 4th century) was a minister and military general of Han-Zhao during the Sixteen Kingdoms period. He helped Liu Yao defeat a major rebellion in 320 when the non-Xiongnu tribes in the Guanzhong region rose up against him.

== Life ==
You Ziyuan was born into a barbarian clan in Dali County. He was described as handsome and intelligent with a love for learning. At the age of 15, he moved to Luoyang to study. During this time, Zhang Hua, an influential minister of the Jin dynasty, met with Ziyuan and was surprised by his talents. Zhang praised him by saying, "This child is both elegant and noble. He may one day join the Three Excellencies."

Ziyuan eventually found himself serving under Han-Zhao, and by Liu Yao's reign, he was already the Household Counsellor With Golden Tassel. In 320, a group of conspirators led by Jie Hu and Yin Che plotted to rebel and overthrow Liu Yao. They allied themselves with the Ba people, but they were quickly discovered by Liu Yao and imprisoned. Jie Hu and Yin Che were executed first. Liu Yao imprisoned the Ba leaders involved in the plot including Gou Xu and She Peng. He also wanted to execute all of them but You Ziyuan remonstrated him, "The sage ruler is judicious with the application of justice. You should only execute the actual leaders of the plot. Do not indulge in further killings." You Ziyuan and Liu Yao argued over this matter to the point it was said that Ziyuan kowtowed till his head started bleeding. In the end, Liu Yao grew tired of Ziyuan's opposition and had him imprisoned as Liu Yao believed Ziyuan was conspiring with the rebels.

Liu Yao had the dozens of Ba leaders killed and had their bodies up for display in the market and thrown into the river. The Ba people were angry because of this and acclaimed Gou Quzhi as their leader. Gou declared himself King of Great Qin and swore to conquer Zhao. To make matters worse, the Di, Qiang, Jie and other Ba tribes in the Guanzhong region rose up in support of Gou, reaching up to 300,000 rebels all placing Chang'an under siege.

You Ziyuan started a petition from prison offering more opposition to Liu Yao's plans. This only made Liu Yao scorn him more, and he began considering executing him. However, Liu Yao ministers including Zhu Ji and Huyan Yan defended Ziyuan, pleading his innocence and loyalty. In the end, Liu Yao pardoned Ziyuan and welcomed him back into the government.

After Ziyuan's release, Liu Yao was about to lead his forces against Gou Quzhi. You Ziyuan stopped him, offering himself instead to take charge. Ziyuan advised him that he should instead grant an amnesty first, pardoning those involved in the plot and their family members to convince the rebels to lay down their weapons. He also told him to give him only five thousand weak soldiers to campaign against the rebel. Liu Yao listened to his advice and handed over command to him by appointing him Grand General of Chariots and Cavalry and as Commander of expeditionary forces in Yongzhou and Qinzhou.

You Ziyuan set out to Yongcheng (in modern Baoji, Shaanxi) and then to Anding, where he received the surrender of thousands of rebels. Gou Quzhi and his family holed themselves up at Yinmi (in modern Pingliang, Gansu), where You Ziyuan marched his troops and destroyed them. Although Gou Quzhi had been defeated, one of the rebel leaders, Xuchu Quanchu declared himself as the new King of Qin at Longyou (in modern Haidong Prefecture, Qinghai). You Ziyuan defeated him multiple times but, although Quanchu now wanted to surrender, his son Xuchu Yiyu persuaded him to continue the fight.

Xuchu Yiyu went out and defended the ramparts from You Ziyuan. Ziyuan worried about Xuchu Yiyu as he observed him to be a powerful general. Ziyuan camped in his defences and refused to give him any fight. You Ziyuan waited throughout the night and in the dawn, the wind made the surroundings hazed with dust. You Ziyuan launched a surprise attack and captured Xuchu Yiyu and his army. Afraid, Xuchu Quanchu surrendered to Ziyuan. Liu Yao was pleased with Ziyuan. He gave Xuchu Quanchu and Yiyu positions in the government while awarding You Ziyuan the positions of Grand Minister Over The Masses and chief of the affairs of the Masters of Writing.

In 322, Liu Yao built a new massive tomb to relocate his deceased father and mother. The building took sixty thousand workers and was completed after a hundred days of hard gruelling labour. You Ziyuan tried to get Liu Yao to stop the project, but he refused to listen.

Since then, nothing was recorded of You Ziyuan. In 326, his title of Grand Minister Over the Masses was handed over to Liu Sui.
