= Huyan Yan =

Early 4th century Han Zhao general and minister

- 呼延晏

Grand Tutor (太傅)
- In office 323–?
- Monarch: Liu Yao

Personal details
- Born: Unknown
- Died: Unknown

Huyan Yan (fl. 310–323) was a Xiongnu military general and minister of Han-Zhao during the Sixteen Kingdoms period. He was an important figure during the Disaster of Yongjia in 311 and was also a supporter of Liu Yao following Jin Zhun's coup in 318.

== Life ==
Not much is known about Huyan Yan except that he was from the Xiongnu Huyan clan, an ally to Liu Yuan's clan through Empress Huyan's marriage with him. He and his clan members worked as officers under Liu Yuan's state of Han-Zhao and would continue to do so into Liu Yao's reign.

Huyan Yan's most important contribution to the state and arguably the period as a whole was during the Disaster of Yongjia in July 311. Liu Yao, Shi Le and Wang Mi were instructed by Liu Cong to take the capital of Luoyang from the Jin dynasty. As the Jin defences continued to falter, Liu Cong sent Huyan Yan with fresh troops to aid the trio in taking the capital. Before they could meet up, Huyan Yan placed his supplies at a rampart near Luoyang.

Huyan Yan was the first to arrive at Luoyang, setting fire to much of the city's important infrastructure, plundering its wealth and capturing prisoners as he waited for his reinforcements to arrive. The Jin emperor, Emperor Huai, who was in the capital wanted to escape the city by boat, but Huyan Yan had them burned too. Reinforcements arrived in the form of Wang Mi. The two men led their men into the palace, taking all that they could find in the building from treasures to servants. Emperor Huai attempted to flee, but Wang Mi and Huyan Yan's men found and held him. This event was the beginning of the end for the Jin's control over their northern territories.

In 312, Huyan Yan was appointed as Liu Cong's Supervisor of the Right.

In 315, Liu Cong removed his close advisor, Chen Yuanda from power as he had protested his controversial practice of having multiple empresses at once. Huyan Yan was one of the many ministers to sign a petition offering their positions to Chen Yuanda, so Liu Cong recalled Chen Yuanda to the government. In 318, Liu Cong was dying, so he made a number of appointments to his officials, including making Huyan Yan the Grand Guardian and giving him authority over the Masters of Writings.

Liu Cong's death was followed by turmoil as the chancellor Jin Zhun slaughtered his family and his successor Liu Can in Pingyang the same year. Liu Yao and Shi Le combined forces to attack Jin Zhun. Huyan Yan led the surviving loyalists from Pingyang to meet Liu Yao at Chibi, where they urged him to become emperor. Liu Yao did so, granting amnesty and giving appointments. Huyan Yan in particular was made Minister of Works, and following this, Liu Yao and Shi Le quickly put down Jin Zhun's rebellion.

In 320, Liu Yao was struck with a crisis as the non-Xiongnu tribes in the Guanzhong region rebelled and placed his capital under pressure. He had previously imprisoned the minister, You Ziyuan, who was against his decision to execute all the conspirators of a prior rebellion that had led to the more drastic current one. Now that he had been proven wrong, Liu Yao wanted to kill You Ziyuan too, but Huyan Yan and his peers pleaded for his innocence, and that Liu Yao should forgive and release him instead. Liu Yao agreed and with You Ziyuan, he managed to quell the rebellion in a few months.

Liu Yao went to war with Former Liang in 323. Huyan Yan was tasked in attacking Liang's county of Sangbi (in present-day Longxi County, Gansu). However, the war ended with the two sides peacefully withdrawing and Liang offering their vassalage to Liu Yao. Huyan Yan's last mention was later in 323. Liu Yao's son Liu Yin had returned after he went missing during Jin Zhun's coup back in 318. He supported having Liu Yin replace Liu Xi (Liu Yao's other son) as crown prince, but this was met with a lengthy debate from the other ministers.
