= Wang Mi =

Jin dynasty bandit and Former Zhao general (died 311)

- 王彌

Grand General Who Conquers The East (征東大將軍)
- In office 307 – ?
- Monarch: Liu Yuan

Grand General (大將軍)
- In office c. October 311 – c. November 311
- Monarch: Liu Cong

Personal details
- Born: Unknown Yantai, Shandong
- Died: c. November 311 Ningling County, Henan
- Relations: Wang Qi (grandfather)
- Courtesy name: Zigu (子固)
- Peerage: Duke of Donglai (東萊公); Duke of Qi (齊公)
- Nickname: Flying Leopard (飛豹)

Wang Mi (died c.November 311), courtesy name Zigu, was a Chinese bandit leader and military general of the Han-Zhao dynasty. He participated in a rebellion led by Liu Bogen during the War of the Eight Princes but after it was quelled, he fled to Mount Zhangguang where he became a notorious bandit and was given the nickname "Flying Leopard". After two years of banditry, he joined the Han-Zhao dynasty in 308. He became one of the state's most important commanders in their war against the Jin, playing a crucial role in capturing Luoyang during the Disaster of Yongjia. However, Wang Mi's career was cut short after he was assassinated by his peer and rival Shi Le in 311.

== Background and early life ==
Wang Mi's family came from a line of officials in Donglai Commandery in the Jiaodong Peninsula. His grandfather Wang Qi, courtesy name Kongshuo (孔硕), was the Administrator of Xuantu during Cao Fang's reign; he greatly contributed in the Goguryeo–Wei War, where he served under Guanqiu Jian. (Note: During the war, Wang was once sent by Guanqiu to Buyeo to provide supplies.) In 247, Wang Qi was appointed Administrator of Daifang Commandery; he then assigned officials to mediate between Himiko, queen of Wa and Himikoko, king of Kununokuni. As Administrator of Tianshui, Wang Qi participated in the conquest of Wei's rival state, Shu Han, where he served under Deng Ai. During the reign of Emperor Wu of Jin, Wang Qi was appointed as Administrator of Runan.

In his youth, Wang Mi was noted to be brave and well-versed, surrounding himself with books and records. He also once worked as a knight-errant (Youxia), offering his service around Luoyang. A hermit named Dong Zhongdao (Note: Dong Yang's (董养; "Zhongdao" was his courtesy name) biography in Book of Jin indicated that he was in the capital Luoyang during the early part of the Tai'shi era (265 - 274) of Emperor Wu's reign.) encountered Wang Mi on the road and said to him, "My Lord speaks like a wolf and looks like a leopard. Excellent in confusion, happy with misfortune, assumes all under heaven is disturbed and agitated: not the acts of a scholar and nobleman!"

== Liu Bogen's rebellion ==
During the War of the Eight Princes in April 306, the Prefect of Jian County (near Longkou, Shandong), Liu Bogen staged a revolt in Donglai. Hearing this, Wang Mi brought his followers along with him to join the rebellion and was appointed as Bogen's Chief Clerk. The rebels invaded the capital of Qingzhou in Linzi and the commander of Qingzhou, Sima Lue sent Liu Tun to quell the rebellion. However, the rebels defeated Tun and Sima Lue was forced out of Qingzhou.

Despite the rebellion's initial success, it fell apart later that year with the intervention of the Youzhou warlord Wang Jun. In the wake of Sima Lue's defeat, Wang Jun attacked Liu Bogen to aid Lue in recovering his territories. Bogen was killed in battle and Wang Mi decided to lead the remaining forces to the small islets in the east. However, on his way, he was intercepted and defeated by Gou Chun. Wang Mi survived the attack and fled to Mount Zhangguang (in present-day Pingdu, Shandong) to become a bandit.

== As a bandit leader ==
=== Invasion of Qingzhou and Xuzhou ===
During his time as an bandit, Wang Mi led many raids in Qingzhou against its people. His notoriety earned him the name "Flying Leopard (飛豹)" by locals. In March or April 307, Wang Mi invaded Qingzhou and Xuzhou. He declared himself Grand General Who Conquers the East and executed any official he could find. Emperor Huai's regent, Sima Yue, sent Ju Xian to repel Wang Mi but Wang defeated and killed him. The Inspector of Yanzhou, Gou Xi, was then sent instead and Wang Mi's forces were routed.

=== Siege of Luoyang (308) ===
After his recent defeat, Wang Mi decided to submit to Liu Yuan of Han-Zhao. Liu Yuan accepted his submission and appointed him the Duke of Donglai, Inspector of Qingzhou and Great General who Garrisons the East. With a state now backing him up, he gathered his scattered forces and raised his troops' morale. In c. March 308, he sent out several of his generals to pillage Qingzhou, Xuzhou, Yanzhou and Yuzhou where they killed many of the regions' administrators and prefects. Gou Xi fought Wang Mi's forces multiple time, but this time he could not overcome them. Soon, Wang Mi reached the city of Xuchang, where he emptied the city's arsenal of weapons and equipment to rearm his troops. With his momentum looking unstoppable, Wang Mi set his eyes on Luoyang.

As Wang Mi's army marched towards the capital, Sima Yue sent his marshal, Wang Bin, to defend the capital. The governor of Liangzhou, Zhang Gui, also sent his general Beigong Chun to reinforce the city. When Wang Mi finally arrived at Luoyang on 23 June 308, the Minister Over the Masses, Wang Yan, was appointed to command the army against him. The defences of Luoyang succeeded in overwhelming and driving away Wang Mi. On 26 June 308, Wang Mi burned the city gates before retreating, but Wang Yan sent Wang Bing to pursue him and he was defeated once more at Seven Li Gully.

== Service under Han-Zhao ==
=== During Liu Yuan's reign ===
After failing to capture Luoyang, Wang Mi went to formally join the Han. Liu Yuan and Wang Mi had once befriended each other in their youths during their time in Luoyang. Thus, when Liu Yuan heard that Wang Mi was coming to join him, he welcomed Wang with open arms. Upon meeting Liu Yuan, Wang urged him to declare himself emperor, which Liu would do later that year. Liu Yuan offered Wang Mi a number of posts as part of his welcome, but Wang Mi declined them all; Liu Yuan also praised Wang Mi by comparing him to Dou Rong, Zhuge Liang and Deng Yu.

Under Han, Wang Mi was first tasked in accompanying Liu Yao in invading Henei before joining with Shi Le to attack Linzhang in 308. After that, in October, he and Shi Le besieged Ye, causing the local commander He Yu to abandon the city. Emperor Huai sent Pei Xian to camp at Baima (near present-day Hua County, Henan) to defend against Wang Mi.

In 309, Wang Mi was appointed to a number of important posts; Palace Attendant, Chief Controller of Qingzhou, Xuzhou, Yanzhou, Yuzhou, Jizhou, and Yangzhou and Governor of Qingzhou. After that, he was sent to campaign against the Inspector of Bingzhou, Liu Kun, to capture Huguan county from his territory together with Liu Cong and Shi Le. In order to support Liu Kun, Sima Yue sent Wang Kuang and others to attack Wang Mi but Wang routed them. Meanwhile, Liu Cong and Shi Le defeated Liu Kun's forces and captured Huguan.

Afterwards, Wang Mi participated in Liu Yuan's campaign in Luoyang as a subordinate of Liu Cong. Although Luoyang was poorly defended, the campaign went badly for the Han forces as several of their generals were killed during the assault. Wang Mi advised Liu Cong to retreat as their supplies were beginning to run low, but Liu did not dare to do so without his father's permission. It was not until Liu Yuan recalled his forces that they could retreat, ending the siege in failure.

On 6 January 310, Wang Mi marched his troops south through Huanyuan Pass (approximately 3 km (1.9 mi) northwest of the Shaolin Monastery in Henan) to invade Xiangcheng commandery but he was defeated by the Qihuo general, Bo Sheng at Xinji (in modern Fugou County, Henan). However, at the same time, many refugees in Yingchuan, Xiangcheng, Runan, Nanyang, and Henan commanderies were rebelling in order to join Wang Mi. These refugees, who initially fled to escape the fighting, were discriminated against by the local populace. To show their loyalty to Wang Mi, they set fire to the towns and cities and killed the chief clerks and local officials.

Wang Mi sent a petition to Liu Yuan requesting that his Chief Clerk of the Left, Cao Ni, be appointed General Who Maintains The East in Qingzhou, where he would provide security to Wang's family's members. Wang Mi followed Shi Le in invading Xuzhou, Yuzhou and Yanzhou, routing many of the local generals.

=== Disaster of Yongjia ===
Later in August 310, Liu Yuan died and his son Liu He succeeded him, but was quickly assassinated by his brother, Liu Cong, making Cong the new emperor seven days into He's reign. Liu Cong was determined to capture Luoyang, so he sent Liu Can, Liu Yao, Wang Mi and Shi Le to march towards the capital. Wang Mi joined Liu Yao in order to attack Xiangcheng before marching towards Luoyang. Luoyang had barely survived the year before, and conditions in the city had worsened through famines, bandits, and mistrust among the inhabitants of the city. After the death of Sima Yue, Emperor Huai of Jin's new paramount general, Gou Xi, waited for his arrival at Cangyuan (倉垣, in modern Kaifeng, Henan), leaving Luoyang vulnerable to the Han forces. In 311, Liu Cong sent Huyan Yan to besiege the capital and ordered Wang Mi, Liu Yao and Shi Le to join him. Wang Mi arrived at Luoyang and met up with Huyan Yan. They entered the palace, sacking it and capturing many of the palace's servants. Emperor Huai of Jin, who was still in the capital, was caught on 13 July and sent to the Han's capital in Pingyang.

Although the Han had won a very important victory over the Jin, Wang Mi got into a dispute with Liu Yao. Liu Yao resented Wang for entering the capital before he had and sacking the capital despite having given orders not to do so. As punishment, Liu Yao beheaded his General of the Serrated Gate, Wang Yan. The two men traded blows with each other because of this, leaving thousands of their men dead before Wang Mi's chief clerk Zhang Song advised him to reconcile with Liu Yao, to which Wang Mi agreed and Liu Yao accepted his apology. However, they quarreled again after Wang Mi advised Yao to persuade Liu Cong to move Han's capital from Pingyang to Luoyang. Yao refused to listen, and instead burned the city down. Angered, Wang Mi scolded him, "You Chuge brat, is this how a king or an emperor acts?" Not wanting to escalate it further, Wang Mi returned to Qingzhou.

== Death ==
Wang Mi had long been friends with his colleague, Shi Le, but they were both very suspicious of one another. Shi Le had covertly caught and killed Wang Mi's subordinate Liu Tun who was on his way to inform Cao Ni that he should rally his troops against Shi. Furthermore, Wang Mi's generals Xu Miao and Gao Liang had abandoned him with their troops for Cao Ni. When Wang Mi heard that Shi Le had caught his adversary Gou Xi, he wrote a letter to Shi Le seemingly praising him but subtly patronising him. Wang Mi also sent women and treasures that he had captured and looted at Luoyang to Shi Le as gifts in order to win him over. Shi Le was not amused but his advisor Zhang Bin told him that he should wait until Wang Mi's forces had truly dwindled.

Soon enough, Wang Mi was caught in a stalemate with an enemy general named Liu Rui. Shi Le was fighting Chen Wu at the time but Zhang Bin told him to leave Chen and aid Wang Mi in order to win his trust. Shi Le agreed and helped Wang Mi overcome Liu Rui. Wang Mi was grateful for his assistance and no longer suspected him. After their victory, Shi Le invited Wang Mi over to a feast in Jiwu County (present-day Ningling County, Henan). Wang Mi complied despite Zhang Song's advising him not to. When Wang Mi became drunk at the feast, Shi Le personally beheaded him and absorbed his army.

After the death of Wang Mi, Shi Le sent Liu Cong a petition to justify his actions, calling Wang Mi a rebel. Although Liu Cong was very infuriated by Shi Le's actions, he still wanted to ensure his loyalty to the Han, so he gave no punishment to Shi Le and instead rewarded him with positions. Wang Mi's subordinate, Cao Ni, continued to maintain control over Qingzhou, where he would remain until his defeat by Shi Le's nephew, Shi Hu in 323.

== Family ==
It is not known what happened to Wang Mi's family after Cao Ni's defeat. However, a nephew of Wang Mi named Wang Li, was found alive in 356. He, along with Cao Ni's grandson, Cao Yan, were discovered living among the hills by Former Yan's minister, Ju Yin. Yin's father was Ju Peng, a general who had fought against Cao Ni in Donglai before fleeing to the Liaodong Peninsula to serve Murong Hui. In turn, Peng's father was Ju Xian, the Jin general whom Wang Mi had killed in 307. When Ju Yin was commissioned to govern Donglai, Peng urged his son to find Wang Mi and Cao Ni's descendants and befriend them so that they could properly resolve their conflict. Yin did so and the three men became very close friends, so much so that their bond was famous among the people of Donglai at the time.
