= Disaster of Yongjia =

311 Han-Zhao sack of the capital of China's Jin Dynasty

- Part of the Upheaval of the Five Barbarians
Date	13–14 July 311
Location	Luoyang, Henan
Result	Han victory; fall of Luoyang and capture of Emperor Huai of Jin

Belligerents
Han-Zhao dynasty	Western Jin dynasty

Commanders and leaders
Liu Cong; Huyan Yan; Wang Mi; Liu Yao	Emperor Huai of Jin (POW)

Casualties and losses
Unknown	30,000+

The Disaster of Yongjia (simplified Chinese: 永嘉之乱; traditional Chinese: 永嘉之亂) occurred in July 311 CE, when forces of the Han-Zhao dynasty captured and sacked Luoyang, the capital of the Western Jin dynasty. The Han's army committed a massacre of the city's inhabitants, killing the Jin crown prince, a host of ministers, and over 30,000 civilians. They also burnt down the palaces and dug up the Jin dynasty's mausoleums. Though the Western Jin would survive for a few more years, this event is often seen as one of the worst disasters in Chinese history, as both the emperor and one of the ancient capitals fell to the hands of "barbarian" forces.

== Background ==
Despite the War of the Eight Princes concluding in early 307, the Western Jin court, under the paramountcy of the Prince of Donghai, Sima Yue, had to deal subsequently with an assortment of rebellions throughout the empire. Most concerning was the Five Divisions in Bing province, descendants of the Southern Xiongnu who had established their state of Han in 304. Under the guise of restoring the Han dynasty, they were able to attract many Chinese and tribal rebels on the North China Plain to their cause. Accompanying the constant warfare were great famines which turned many of the people in northern China into refugees or bandits, and there were even rampant cases of cannibalism. In 308, the Han shifted their capital to the Pingyang Commandery, bringing themselves close to the Jin capital, Luoyang.

=== Early attacks on Luoyang ===
Prior to 311, there were several attempts by the Han to take Luoyang. In June 308, the Chinese rebel, Wang Mi, who at this point had only nominally submitted to the Han, led his forces to attack Luoyang shortly after emptying the armory in Xuchang. Despite an early scare, the city's defenders, with reinforcements from Liang province, managed to repel him that same month.

In late 309, encouraged by a Jin defector who claimed that the city was weak and isolated, the Emperor of Han, Liu Yuan, sent his son, Liu Cong to attack Luoyang. Along the way, Liu Cong defeated several Jin generals before reaching Yiyang. However, he became complacent with his victories and did not set up any defense. A Jin general, Yuan Yan, pretended to surrender to him and launched a surprise attack on his camp at night, forcing the Han forces to retreat. In winter, Liu Cong attacked Luoyang again, this time accompanied by Wang Mi, his cousin Liu Yao, and others. He reached Yiyang in December, but was repeatedly defeated by Sima Yue, with many of his generals being killed. In the end, Liu Yuan ordered him to retreat that same month.

=== Prelude to disaster ===
For the rest of his reign, Liu Yuan did not encroach on Luoyang, although his generals continued to raid the North China Plain and recruit more followers. He died in August 310 and was succeeded by his heir Liu He. A week into his reign, Liu He initiated a purge of his brothers, killing all but three before Liu Cong retaliated and killed him. Shortly after taking the throne, Liu Cong renewed efforts to take Luoyang, sending his son Liu Can, Wang Mi, and Liu Yao with 40,000 troops and the Jie general Shi Le to join them at Dayang (in present-day Yuncheng, Shanxi) with 20,000 cavalry troops. They defeated the Jin general, Pei Miao at Mianchi before breaking into the Luoyang region.

Meanwhile, the situation for the Jin within Luoyang had greatly deteriorated. Tensions were high between Sima Yue and Emperor Huai of Jin; previously in 309, to strengthen his grip on the court, Yue had had the Emperor's favourite courtiers executed and replaced the veteran palace guards, who had participated in various coups during the War of the Eight Princes, with soldiers from his own fief. In early 310, a plague of locusts swept through most parts of northern China, including the Luoyang region, causing widespread famine. The severity of the famine is attested in one of Aurel Stein's "Ancient Letters", a letter written by a Sogdian merchant named Nanai-vandak, who claimed that all of the diasporic Sogdians and Indians in the city had died of starvation. Sima Yue’s call for reinforcements went largely ignored, and reinforcements from Jing province in the south were blocked by rebelling refugees in the Nanyang Basin.

Liu Can and Shi Le marched east out of Huanyuan Pass (approximately 3 km (1.9 mi) northwest of the Shaolin Monastery in Henan) and Chenggao Pass (in present-day Xingyang, Henan) respectively, launching raids on the commanderies of Liang, Runan, Chenliu and Yingchuan. Shi Le attempted to take Cangyuan (in present-day Kaifeng, Henan) in Chenliu, but was defeated by the Jin general, Wang Zan. After retreating to Wenshi Crossing (southwest of present-day Xun County, Henan), Shi Le invaded the Nanyang Basin before withdrawing to Xiangcheng near Xuchang.

With the attacks and famine worsening by the day, Sima Yue wanted to bring the imperial army out on the field in order to campaign against Shi Le. Emperor Huai objected to this decision but was ignored. On 22 December 310, Yue marched out with the 40,000-strong imperial army along with many veteran generals and important ministers, initially camping at Xuchang before shifting to nearby Xiang County (in present-day Shenqiu County, Henan). The emperor was left behind with a defenseless city under the watchful eyes of Yue's confidants, Pan Tao, He Lun and Li Yun, along with his son Sima Pi and concubine Lady Pei.

At this point, Emperor Huai could no longer tolerate Yue’s abuse of power and attempted to depose him. He secretly made regular contact Yue’s second-in-command, Gou Xi, who also had had a falling out with the prince. Soon, Gou Xi began openly denouncing Yue for his crimes, and the emperor sent him an imperial edict permitting him to campaign against the prince. However, Yue discovered their plot after intercepting their messenger and prepared to attack Gou Xi, but became overly-stressed by the situation to the point he was bedridden. He passed responsibility over to the minister, Wang Yan, before dying on 23 April 311. Wang Yan decided to lead the imperial army, which had grown to 100,000, towards the prince’s fief in Donghai to hold his funeral, but in May, Shi Le ambushed and annihilated the Jin army at the Battle of Ningping.

== The disaster ==
With the main Jin force in the north destroyed, Luoyang was now without an army to defend it. After hearing of Sima Yue's death, He Lun, Li Yun and Yue's other followers fled the capital, but were defeated by Shi Le at Weicang (northwest of present-day Yanling County, Henan). Gou Xi proposed to Emperor Huai to move the capital to his base in Cangyuan, sending his subordinate, Liu Hui with several dozen boats, 500 guards and 1,000 hú of grain to welcome him. The emperor wanted to go, but many of his ministers and attendants were initially reluctant to leave, not wanting to leave behind their wealth and property, and so he decided to remain.

Soon, however, the famine in Luoyang reached a point where the inhabitants resorted to cannibalism, and around eighty to ninety percent of the government officials abandoned the capital. Emperor Huai held a council with his remaining ministers, urging that they leave, but his guards and followers were unprepared, and there were no carts or carriages to transport them. He sent out Fu Zhi and a few other officials to gather more boats and oars from nearby Heyin (in modern Luoyang, Henan). Meanwhile, he also tried to walk through the city, but was harassed by thieves and forced back into his palace.

=== Fall of Luoyang ===
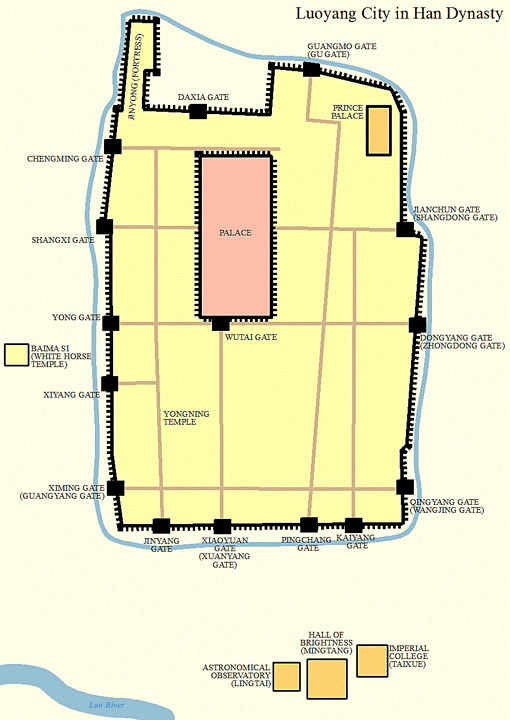
A map of Luoyang during the Eastern Han dynasty showing the locations of Pingchang, Dongyang, Xuanyang and Ximing gates.

Liu Cong sent his general Huyan Yan with 27,000 soldiers to attack Luoyang while ordering Liu Yao, Wang Mi and Shi Le to join him. Before reaching Henan, Huyan Yan defeated the Jin army twelve times and killed more than 30,000 soldiers. As the other generals had yet to arrive, he stored his supplies at the ramparts near Luoyang that had been previously built by the Jin general, Zhang Fang, in 303. On 29 June 311, he reached the city itself and attacked Pingchang Gate (on the southern wall) the next day. He captured the gate on 2 July and proceeded to set fire to the Dongyang Gate (on the eastern wall) and several government buildings. However, as his peers had still not arrived, he withdrew with his loot and captives on 3 July while burning the boats to prevent the Emperor from escaping.

Wang Mi arrived at the Xuanyang Gate (on the southern wall next to the Pingchang Gate) on 7 July while Liu Yao arrived at the Ximing Gate (the southmost end of the western wall) on 8 July. On 13 July, Huyan Yan and Wang Mi captured the Xuanyang Gate. They entered the Southern Palace and ascended through the front of Taiji Hall, where they allowed their soldiers to sack it and capture the palace's servants. Emperor Huai attempted to flee through the gates of Hualin Garden, hoping to escape to Chang'an, but was subdued by Han troops and imprisoned at the Duan Gate (the main southern gate of the palace).

Liu Yao entered through the Ximing Gate and camped at the Arsenal. On 14 July, he massacred around 30,000 civilians, including the crown prince, Sima Quan, other princes and officials, and built a mound of corpses. He also had Jin imperial tombs dug up and burned down the palaces, ancestral temples, and government offices. Liu Yao sent Emperor Huai and his six imperial seals back to Pingyang, while claiming the former empress of the late Emperor Hui of Jin, Yang Xianrong as his wife.

== Aftermath ==
The fall of Luoyang and capture of Emperor Huai was a symbolic victory for the Han, as Liu Cong declared a general amnesty and changed the reign era. He also appointed Emperor Huai as an official and demoted his title to Duke of Ping'a. Back in Luoyang, Liu Yao and Wang Mi attacked each other over disagreements during the course of the sacking, but soon reconciled. While Wang Mi suggested that they shift the capital to Luoyang, Liu Yao believed that the city was too surrounded by enemies and instead burnt it down before leaving. Not long after, the Han capitalized on their victory by sending Liu Yao and Liu Can to conquer Chang'an from the Jin, briefly bringing the two ancient capitals under their control.

With Emperor Huai in captivity, several provisional governments were set up. A brother of Sima Quan, Sima Duan fled to Gou Xi, who acclaimed him the new crown prince and moved their base from Cangyuan to Mengcheng. However, Mengcheng suffered from famine and plague, and Shi Le captured the two men in October. Fu Zhi established a provisional government in Heyin, but had very little reach and was extinguished by the Han in 312. The Jin Inspector of You Province, Wang Jun, also formed his own provisional government within his domain, acclaiming an unnamed candidate as the new crown prince.

Days before the fall, a minister, Xun Fan fled the city, and following Emperor Huai's capture, he founded a provisional government at Mi County. Emperor Huai and Xun Fan's 11-year-old nephew, Sima Ye sought refuge with him. Meanwhile, after the fall of Chang'an, a group of Jin generals gathered at Anding Commandery and led a combined force to retake the city. Xun Fan's general, Yan Ding, brought Sima Ye over to join them, and after recapturing Chang'an in 312, Ye ascended the throne, posthumously known as Emperor Min of Jin. With his government, the Western Jin would survive before they were finally crushed by the Han in 316.

Several other parts of northern China continued to resist the Han, such as Liu Kun in Bing province and Zhang Gui in Liang province, and it would take more than a decade before the last Jin remnants in the north were wiped out. Emperor Huai was executed in 313 after Liu Cong suspected of him of rebelling. Luoyang remained a hotly contested region among the competing states in the coming years, but it would not be until 495, during the reign of Emperor Xiaowen of Northern Wei, that it regained its status as a capital.

== See also ==
- Upheaval of the Five Barbarians
