= Linxi County, Hebei =

Linxi County 临西县
- County
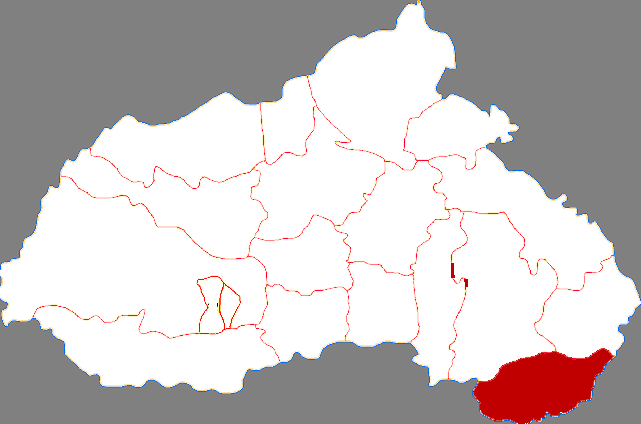
- Linxi in Xingtai

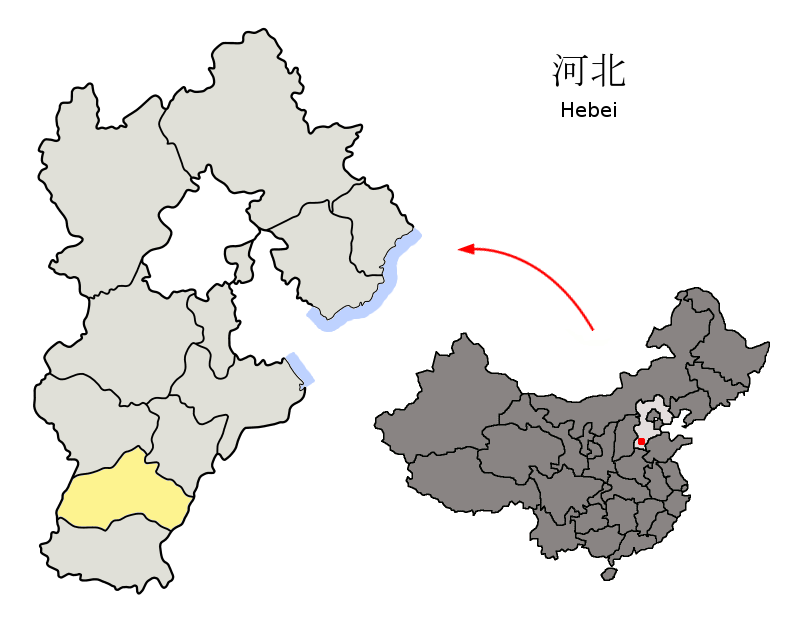
- Xingtai in Hebei
- Coordinates: 36°52′16″N 115°30′04″E
- Country: People's Republic of China
- Province: Hebei
- Prefecture-level city: Xingtai
- County seat: Linxi Town (临西镇)

Area
  - Total: 542 km^{2} (209 sq mi)
- Elevation: 36 m (118 ft)

Population
  - Total: 320,000
  - Density: 590/km^{2} (1,500/sq mi)
- Time zone: UTC+8 (China Standard)
- Postal code: 054900

Linxi County (simplified Chinese: 临西县; traditional Chinese: 臨西縣; pinyin: Línxī Xiàn) is a county in the south of Hebei Province, China, bordering Shandong to the south and east. It is the southernmost county-level division of the prefecture-level city of Xingtai, and is located in its southeast corner. It has a population of 320,000 residing in an area of 542 km^{2} (209 sq mi).

== Administrative divisions ==
The county administers 5 towns and 4 townships.

Towns:

- Linxi (临西镇), Hexi (河西镇), Xiabaosi (下堡寺镇), Jianzhong (尖冢镇), Laoguanzhai (老官寨镇)

Townships:

- Lüzhai Township (吕寨乡), Yao'anzhen Township (摇安镇乡), Daliuzhuang Township (大刘庄乡), Dongzaoyuan Township (东枣元乡)

== Climate ==
Climate data for Linxi, elevation 35 m (115 ft), (1991–2020 normals, extremes 1981–2010)
Month	Jan	Feb	Mar	Apr	May	Jun	Jul	Aug	Sep	Oct	Nov	Dec	Year
Record high °C (°F)	18.4 (65.1)	24.7 (76.5)	29.2 (84.6)	33.3 (91.9)	40.5 (104.9)	42.7 (108.9)	40.9 (105.6)	36.4 (97.5)	37.8 (100.0)	32.3 (90.1)	27.4 (81.3)	21.4 (70.5)	42.7 (108.9)
Mean daily maximum °C (°F)	3.8 (38.8)	8.1 (46.6)	14.8 (58.6)	21.3 (70.3)	26.9 (80.4)	32.2 (90.0)	32.1 (89.8)	30.4 (86.7)	27.1 (80.8)	21.3 (70.3)	12.4 (54.3)	5.4 (41.7)	19.7 (67.4)
Daily mean °C (°F)	−2.0 (28.4)	1.9 (35.4)	8.2 (46.8)	14.8 (58.6)	20.5 (68.9)	25.7 (78.3)	27.1 (80.8)	25.4 (77.7)	20.7 (69.3)	14.5 (58.1)	6.3 (43.3)	−0.2 (31.6)	13.6 (56.4)
Mean daily minimum °C (°F)	−6.7 (19.9)	−3.1 (26.4)	2.6 (36.7)	8.8 (47.8)	14.4 (57.9)	19.8 (67.6)	22.8 (73.0)	21.4 (70.5)	15.7 (60.3)	9.0 (48.2)	1.3 (34.3)	−4.6 (23.7)	8.5 (47.2)
Record low °C (°F)	−19.8 (−3.6)	−16.6 (2.1)	−7.9 (17.8)	−2.3 (27.9)	2.5 (36.5)	8.1 (46.6)	15.8 (60.4)	12.2 (54.0)	4.1 (39.4)	−3.4 (25.9)	−19.7 (−3.5)	−19.9 (−3.8)	−19.9 (−3.8)
Average precipitation mm (inches)	2.8 (0.11)	8.5 (0.33)	8.7 (0.34)	28.0 (1.10)	44.5 (1.75)	67.0 (2.64)	136.8 (5.39)	120.8 (4.76)	44.5 (1.75)	31.8 (1.25)	17.3 (0.68)	3.9 (0.15)	514.6 (20.25)
Average precipitation days (≥ 0.1 mm)	2.0	3.0	2.8	5.1	6.4	8.2	11.4	9.4	6.7	5.2	4.2	2.2	66.6
Average snowy days	2.7	2.6	0.8	0.2	0	0	0	0	0	0	0.9	2.3	9.5
Average relative humidity (%)	62	57	54	61	65	62	78	83	77	69	68	66	67
Mean monthly sunshine hours	155.6	159.9	209.3	228.2	253.4	223.7	189.3	192.9	189.0	183.8	159.4	156.5	2,301
Percentage possible sunshine	50	52	56	58	58	51	43	46	51	54	53	52	52
Source: China Meteorological Administration
