= Zu Ti =

Jin dynasty general (266-321)

- 祖逖
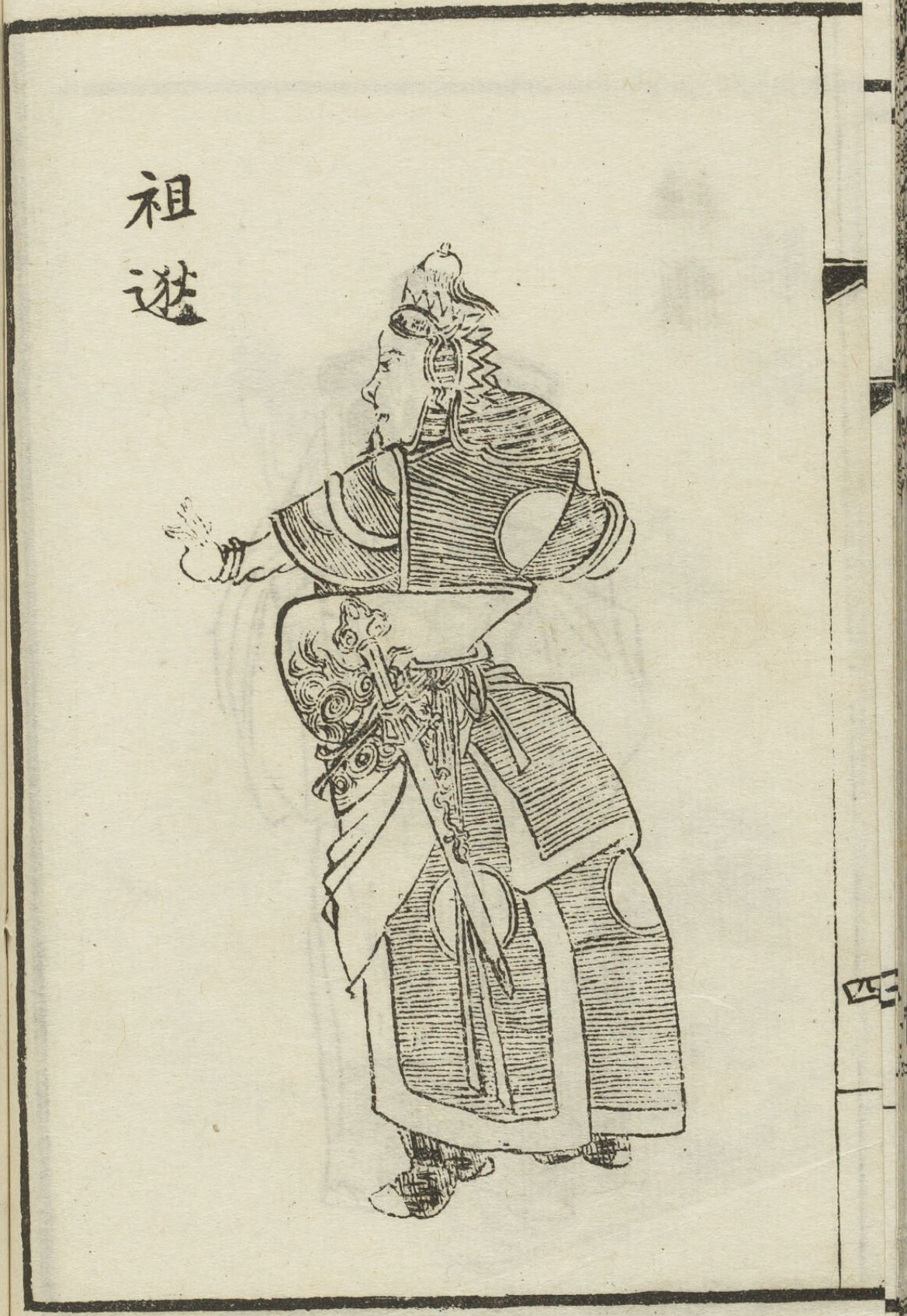

Inspector of Yu Province (豫州刺史)
- In office 313 – 321
- Monarch: Emperor Min of Jin/Emperor Yuan of Jin

General Who Exerts Might (奮威將軍)
- In office 313–321
- Monarch: Emperor Min of Jin/Emperor Yuan of Jin

Personal details
- Born: 266 Qiuxian county, Hebei
- Died: c.October 321 (aged 55) Zhengzhou, Henan
- Relations: Zu Yue (brother); Zu Gai (brother); Zu Na (half-brother); Zu Dashou (alleged descendant)
- Children: Zu Huan; Zu Mi; Zu Pei; Zu Shei; Zu Ji; Zu Xian
- Parent: Zu Wu (father)
- Occupation: Military general
- Courtesy name: Shizhi (士稚)

Zu Ti (266 – c.October 321), courtesy name Shizhi, was a Chinese military general of the Jin dynasty. Between 313 and 321, he commanded an expeditionary force to reclaim territory in northern China that were lost during the Upheaval of the Five Barbarians. Although Zu Ti received little support from the Jin court in Jiankang, he was able to push all the way to the south of the Yellow River, battling local warlords, the Han-Zhao dynasty and then the Later Zhao dynasty. Zu Ti fought Later Zhao to a truce before having his authority diminished by the Jin imperial court due to concerns of a civil war back home. He soon died in disappointment, and his gains were quickly overturned by the Zhao following his death. Zu Ti's northern expedition was the first in a series by the Jin launched against the Sixteen Kingdoms, and though it yielded little success, he has since been lauded as a hero for his determination to reclaim lost northern territory.

== Early life ==
=== Childhood ===
Zu Ti was born into a line of county-level officials in Qiuxian county, Fanyang commandery. As a child, he was described as unruly and carefree. He was said to be illiterate until the age of 14 or 15. This worried his brothers, but the young Zu was also known to be generous and ambitious. Often, he would distribute his grain and silk among the poor, which garnered him the respect of his village clansmen. As he grew older, he took the initiative to study and moved to the capital, Luoyang, where he educated himself on history and ongoing affairs. The people of Luoyang at the time thought of him as a prodigy. In 289, while living away in Yangping Commandery, Zu Ti was nominated by the local administration to become a Xiaolian and a Xiucai, but he turned down both offers.

=== War of the Eight Princes ===
After his stint in Sichuan, Zu Ti went on to serve several different lords during the so-called War of the Eight Princes (291–306). He first served under the Prince of Qi, Sima Jiong, then the Prince of Changsha, Sima Ai, then the Prince of Yuzhang, Sima Chi, before finally working with the Prince of Donghai, Sima Yue. Zu Ti worked as a Registrar under Sima Ai and was in Luoyang when Ai was besieged by the coalition of Sima Yong and Sima Ying between 302 and 304. During the siege, Zu Ti advised Ai to send an imperial edict to Yong's general, Liu Chen (劉沈), ordering him to attack his superior. Ai did so and was able to convince Liu Chen, forcing Sima Yong to divert his attention to Chang'an.

In 304, Zu Ti participated in Sima Yue's failed campaign in Dangyin (盪陰, today Tangyin County, Henan), where they were badly defeated by Sima Ying and forced back to Luoyang. While Emperor Hui of Jin was held hostage in Chang'an, Zu Ti was approached and invited to serve by several other princes, namely Sima Xiao (司馬虓), Sima Lüe (司馬略) and Sima Mo (司馬模), but he declined them all. After his mother died, Zu Ti resigned from the government to mourn her.

=== Fleeing south ===
In July 311, Luoyang and Emperor Huai of Jin were captured by the forces of the Han-Zhao dynasty. To avoid the chaos in the north, Zu Ti and a group of refugees decided to flee south of Yangtze River to Sikou (泗口, located at Xuzhou, Jiangsu). Zu walked on foot, giving his horses and carriages to the sick and old as well as giving food, clothes, and medicines to those who needed them. The group met with bandits along the way, but Zu was able to help them cope with this. Because of this, the refugees elected Zu to be their leader for the rest of their journey. After arriving in Sikou, Zu Ti was appointed the Inspector of Xuzhou and later the Army Libationer-Advisor by the Prince of Langye, Sima Rui. Zu based himself in Jingkou, where he began recruiting abled men into his army.

== Northern expedition ==
=== Returning north ===
In 313, a new Jin government was established in Chang'an headed by Emperor Min of Jin. Min sent an edict to Sima Rui instructing him to advance north to help in restoring the Central Plains. However, Rui showed very little interest in carrying out the edict. Seeing this, Zu confidently approached Sima Rui, volunteering himself to oversee an expedition to the north. Rui was not entirely moved by Zu's display of confidence, but nonetheless permitted him and appointed him as Inspector of Yuzhou and General Who Exerts Might. He also provided Zu Ti with food and clothes for his soldiers but not weapons and armor. Zu also had to do the recruitments himself.

Regardless, Zu Ti led his forces north and crossed the Yangtze. While crossing, Zu Ti was said to have struck his oar and declared, "If Zu Ti is not able to restore the Central Plains and return, then let he be like this great river (and never return)!" Zu Ti landed in Huaiyin county in 313, where he built smithies and foundries to have his soldiers produce their own weapons.

=== Subduing Zhang Ping and Fan Ya ===
Zu Ti's first adversaries in his northern expedition were the manor lords, Zhang Ping (張平) and Fan Ya (樊雅), who had set up their fortresses in the Qiao princely fief. Previously, in 316, Zhang and Fan had raised their troops in Yu province to assist the Inspector of Yan province, Liu Yan against the Han-Zhao general, Shi Le. Liu, through his own assent, appointed Zhang as the Inspector of Yu and Fan as the Administrator of Qiao.

In 317, Zu Ti camped at Luzhou and had his Army Advisor Yin Ai (殷乂) pay them visits. Unbeknownst to Zu, Yin Ai accused Zhang of treasonous behaviour, which led to Zhang executing him. Both Zhang and Zu Ti rallied their troops against each other soon after. Initially, Zu was unable to break through Zhang's defenses, so he instead plotted to have one of Zhang's generals, Xie Fu (謝浮), turn against him. His ploy succeeded, resulting in Xie Fu assassinating Zhang Ping and surrendering with the rest of Zhang's army. However, Zu Ti was running low on supplies, and he later moved to Taiqiu County (太丘; in present day Yongcheng, Henan).

Parts of Qiao were still controlled by Fan Ya, who was startled by Zu Ti's recent actions. He led his troops to launch a night attack on Zu Ti's camp. Zu Ti's troops were caught by surprise, but Zu quickly regrouped them and turned away Fan Ya. Zu then attacked Fan but was caught in a stalemate, so he requested the Administrator of Chenliu, Chen Chuan (陳川), and the General of the Household of the South, Wang Han (王含) for reinforcements. Chen Chuan and Wang Han sent Li Tou (李頭) and Huan Xuan respectively to help Zu. Huan was a rather respected individual at the time, and knowing this, Zu decided to use him to negotiate peace with Fan Ya. Fan was convinced by Huan Xuan's reasoning and persuasion, so he agreed to surrender himself and Qiao to Zu Ti.

Zu Ti's success in Qiao caught the attention Shi Le, who at the time was expanding his influence in northeastern China. Concerned, he sent his nephew, Shi Hu, to capture Qiao. Wang Han dispatched Huan Xuan again to help Zu Ti, and together, they defeated and drove back Shi Hu.

=== Battle of Junyi ===
In 319, Chen Chuan grew abhorrent of Zu Ti after hearing Li Tou lament about not being able to serve Zu, who had treated him well during their time against Fan Ya. Chen Chuan had Li Tou executed for his comments, but this caused Li's friend, Feng Chong (馮寵), to join Zu Ti with 400 people. Angered, Chen Chuan pillaged the commanderies of Yuzhou, but Zu Ti campaigned against and routed him.

After his defeat, Chen Chuan submitted to Shi Le, who at this point, had broken away from Han-Zhao and formed his state of Later Zhao. Zu Ti attacked Chen at Pengguan (蓬關, in modern-day Chenliu, Henan) but was driven back by Shi Hu at Junyi county (浚儀, in modern-day Kaifeng). Reinforcements from Shi Le's general, Tao Bao forced Zu Ti to retreat to Huainan whilst Shi Hu relocated Chen Chuan and his followers to Zhao's capital in Xiangguo. In 320, Zu Ti sent his general, Han Qian (韓潛) to attack Junyi. The city was split into two sections, with the eastern half occupied by Han Qian and the other occupied by Tao Bao.

Both sides suffered from food shortages, but Zu Ti was able to sell a false impression that his army was more well-supplied than Tao's, which demoralized the Later Zhao troops. Later, when the Zhao general, Liu Yetang (劉夜堂) was transporting grains for Tao Bao, Han Qian and another one of Zu Ti's generals, Feng Tie (馮鐵), attacked Liu at the Bian River and took all of the grains. After 40 days, Tao Bao began to feel overwhelmed, so he fled during the night and retreated to Dongye (東燕, in modern-day Henan). Zu Ti ordered Han Qian to place pressure on Tao from Fengqiu while Feng Tie occupied the rest of Junyi.

=== Truce with Later Zhao ===
At the same time, Zu Ti moved his base to Yongqiu and launched raids against the Later Zhao army, accepting many surrenders from their troops. He also got the Jin generals Guo Mo, Li Ju, Zhao Gu (趙固) and Shangguan Si (上官巳), who were all stationed along the Huai River, to accept his authority after settling a quarrel between the four men. Later Zhao's borders were beginning to feel the strain, so Shi Le sought for peace with Zu Ti.

Shi Le restored Zu Ti's grandfather and father's tombs as an act of good faith and offered to allow trade between them. Although Zu Ti did not directly reply, trade between the two sides occurred just as Shi Le had wanted. One time, Zu Ti's General of the Standard, Tong Jian (童建) defected to Shi Le, but Shi had him beheaded. Tong's head was returned to Zu Ti along with a letter of friendship by Shi Le. Zu Ti was so impressed at his display that he later ordered his followers to return any defector from Zhao and forbid them from pillaging Shi Le's land. Conflict between the two sides gradually died down, and the border between Jin and Zhao experienced a short period of amity.

== Death ==
While Zu Ti was campaigning against Shi Le, the tension between Sima Rui (Emperor Yuan of Jin as of 318) and his powerful general Wang Dun was beginning to reach its breaking point. To protect himself from Wang, one decision that Emperor Yuan did in 321 was to appoint the southern gentry Dai Yuan as Chief Controller in Yuzhou, effectively making Zu Ti a subordinate to Dai. This left Zu distraught, as he did not think that Dai had the foresight to realize Zu's plans for the north. He also felt snubbed, seeing how quickly he was demoted despite his efforts. Combined with the possibility of civil war in the south, Zu believed his ambitions to reclaim the north were over, and he soon became severely ill.

Despite this, Zu insisted on making progress. He camped at Hulao (虎牢, in modern Zhengzhou, Henan) intending to build a barrier south of the city to defend against invading forces, but before he could complete it, he succumbed to his illness in c.October 321. Zu Ti's death was mourned by the people of Yuzhou who deeply respected and loved him; they mourned as though they had lost their parents. The people of Qiao and Liang erected shrines dedicated to him.

Wang Dun had long feared Zu Ti's strength, so he was relieved by the news of his death and became more eager to oppose Sima Rui. Zu Ti's younger brother, Zu Yue, was appointed to replace him as General Who Pacifies The West and Inspector of Yuzhou, but he was not as talented as Ti and not on good terms with his brother's generals. Later Zhao capitalized on Zu's death by resuming hostilities with Jin in 322. Zu Yue was unable to defend his territory and retreated to Shouchun, allowing Zhao to regain the territories they had lost to Zu Ti.

== Friendship with Liu Kun ==
Zu Ti is most known for his friendship with another famous Jin general during his time, Liu Kun. The two met each other while serving as registrars in Sizhou in the 290s. The two were very close to one another, often discussing worldly affairs among themselves and even sharing the same bedchamber. When they could not sleep at night, they would often remind each other, "When the Four Seas boil and heroes rise side by side, you and I should avoid each other on the Central Plains." After Zu Ti was transferred to a higher office, Liu Kun wrote to his relatives, "The spear is my pillow as I await dawn, for my ambition is to vanquish the enemy. I often fear that Zu Ti would be the first to crack the whip."

=== "Rising at Cockcrow to Practice the Sword" ===
A famous story goes that one night, when Zu Ti and Liu Kun were sleeping on the same bed, Zu heard the sound of a cockcrow in the middle of the night. In old times, this was seen as a bad omen. However, Zu saw this differently. He kicked Liu Kun awake, telling him, "This is no evil sound." They then got out of their bed and performed a sword dance. A Chinese proverb, "rising at cockcrow to practice the sword (聞雞起舞)" is accredited to this story, and is used to describe diligence.
