= War of the Eight Princes =

291–306 AD series of civil wars in the Chinese Jin dynasty

The War of the Eight Princes, Rebellion of the Eight Kings, or Rebellion of the Eight Princes (simplified Chinese: 八王之乱; traditional Chinese: 八王之亂; pinyin: bā wáng zhī luàn; Wade–Giles: pa wang chih luan) was a series of coups and civil wars among kings/princes (Chinese: wáng 王) of the Chinese Western Jin dynasty from 291 to 306 AD. The period spanned the reign of Emperor Hui of Jin, whose powerful relatives fiercely contended with one another over his regency and succession in light of his developmental disability. The name of the conflict is derived from the biographies of the eight princes collected in Chapter 59 of the Book of Jin. (Note: However, using "eight princes" as a collective reference may have appeared as early as the Eastern Jin, e.g. the Jin Bawang Gushi (晋八王故事; "Stories of the Eight Princes of Jin"), which Liang dynasty scholar Liu Xiaobiao cited in his annotations to Shishuo Xinyu. Since Bawang Gushi had been lost (with fragments surviving as annotations or in collections), it is impossible to determine if the eight princes it referred to were the same eight as recorded in vol.59 of the Tang-era Book of Jin.)

The "War of the Eight Princes" is somewhat of a misnomer: rather than one continuous conflict, the War of the Eight Princes saw intervals of peace interposed with short and intense periods of internecine conflict. At no point in the whole conflict were all of the eight princes on one side of the fighting (as opposed to, for example, the Rebellion of the Seven States). The initial conflicts prior to the coalition against Sima Lun in 301 were also not wars, but rather a series of political intrigues and coups d'état. The literal Chinese translation, Disorder of the Eight Kings, may be more appropriate in this regard.

While initial conflicts were relatively minor and confined to the imperial capital of Luoyang and its surroundings, the scope of the war expanded with each new prince who entered the struggle. The civil wars opened the empire to rebellions, most notably by tribal subjects that had resettled into the Central Plains. At its conclusion, the war devastated the Jin heartlands in northern China, and ushered in the Sixteen Kingdoms era in northern China, causing more than a century of warfare between the numerous short-lived dynasties in the north and the Eastern Jin dynasty in the south.

== The Eight Princes ==
The "Eight Princes" is a Tang-era retrospective grouping from the joint biography of eight Sima family royals who held control over the Jin imperial court during the reign of Emperor Hui of Jin. Their biographies jointly appear in Chapter 59 of the Book of Jin (compiled 648 AD). The following table lists them in rough chronological order by the date each first held effective power at the Luoyang court. Generational labels follow descent from Sima Yi (司馬懿, 179–251), the dynasty's posthumously-honoured founder.

The Eight Princes of the Jin civil war (291–306)
Name (Pinyin)	Chinese	Born – Died	Relation to Sima Yi	Princely title	Period of dominance at court	Cause of death	Notes
Sima Liang	司馬亮	? – 291	Son (4th surviving son, by Lady Fu)	Prince of Ru'nan (汝南王)	March – June 291 (c. 3 months)	Killed at his residence by troops of Sima Wei acting on a forged edict procured by Empress Jia Nanfeng	Senior surviving member of his generation. Named co-regent with Wei Guan after the overthrow of Yang Jun; his cautious, conciliatory style alienated both the empress and the younger princes.
Sima Wei	司馬瑋	271 – 291	Great-Grandson (5th son of Emperor Wu Sima Yan)	Prince of Chu (楚王)	Effectively a single night in June 291	Beheaded in the Eastern Market of Luoyang the morning after killing Liang, after Empress Jia publicly disavowed the edict she had given him	Hot-tempered and young (aged 20). His use as a cat's-paw and rapid disposal set the template for the next fifteen years of court politics.
Sima Lun	司馬倫	? – 301	Son (9th and youngest son, by Lady Bai)	Prince of Zhao (趙王)	Late 300 – May 301 (as regent then usurper)	Forced to drink poisoned wine (gold-flake liquor, 金屑酒) after being deposed	Only one of the eight to formally usurp the throne (proclaimed himself emperor in January 301, deposing Emperor Hui). His coup against Empress Jia in 300 is conventionally treated as the start of the war's open military phase. Dominated by his advisor Sun Xiu.
Sima Jiong	司馬冏	? – 302	Great-grandson (son of Sima You, who was Sima Zhao's son and Emperor Wu's brother)	Prince of Qi (齊王)	Late May 301 – January 303 (c. 18 months)	Killed in street fighting at Luoyang by forces of Sima Ai; head displayed at the Eastern Gate	Led the coalition that overthrew Sima Lun and restored Emperor Hui. As Grand Marshal (大司馬), ruled in the emperor's name from his own residence rather than the palace, which contemporaries cited as the cause of his fall.
Sima Ai	司馬乂	277 – 304	Great-Grandson (6th son of Emperor Wu)	Prince of Changsha (長沙王)	January 303 – January 304 (c. 12 months)	Roasted to death over a slow fire on the orders of Zhang Fang, Sima Yong's general	The only one of the eight widely portrayed in the sources as competent and personally honourable. Held Luoyang against the combined armies of Ying and Yong for months before being betrayed from inside the city by Sima Yue.
Sima Ying	司馬穎	279 – 306	Great-Grandson (16th son of Emperor Wu)	Prince of Chengdu (成都王)	304 (designated Imperial Younger Brother [皇太弟] and heir)	Strangled in prison in Ye by Liu Yu, an official under the Prince of Fanyang, Sima Xiao.	Based at Ye, not Luoyang; preferred to govern from his base. Had the strongest military until defeat by Wang Jun (Sima Yue's ally) and quickly lost power. Was the only one among the eight princes to be designated Imperial Younger Brother and heir
Sima Yong	司馬顒	? – 306 (or early 307)	Grand-nephew (grandson of Sima Fu, Sima Yi's younger brother)	Prince of Hejian (河間王)	304 – 305 (jointly with Ying); Chang'an-based throughout	Strangled in his carriage en route to Luoyang after being lured there with a promise of the office of Excellency over the Masses (司徒)	Not descended from Sima Yi, but maneuvered opportunistically to gain control as the direct descendants of Sima Yi killed each other. His general Zhang Fang was the period's most feared field commander; controlling Guanzhong gave Yong a power base independent of the Luoyang court.
Sima Yue	司馬越	? – 311	Grand-nephew (grandson of Sima Kui, Sima Yi's younger brother)	Prince of Donghai (東海王)	306 – 311 (c. 5 years; the longest tenure among the eight)	Died of illness (sources say of anxiety) at Xiang while leading an army against Shi Le	One of two non-direct descendants of Sima Yi among the eight princes. Seized Sima Ai in a palace coup. Then relied on the armies of his brothers Sima Teng, Sima Mo, Sima Lue and their allies to defeat Sima Ying, Sima Yong and their allies. Conventionally considered the last of the Eight Princes and nominal victor. Believed to have poisoned Emperor Hui in January 307 and enthroned Emperor Huai. His death and the destruction of his army by Shi Le in 311 opened the way for the Disaster of Yongjia and the fall of Luoyang.

Other people of note included Emperor Hui of Jin, Emperor Hui's first regent Yang Jun, Empress Dowager Yang, Empress Jia Nanfeng, and the senior minister Wei Guan. It is also important to note that the fiefdom titles of the princes do not reflect their base of operation. Although Sima Ying was the Prince of Chengdu, he mostly operated in Ye and was never near his fief, while Sima Yong, the Prince of Hejian, mainly stayed around Chang'an. Only Sima Yue made use of his fief in Donghai as a base during the course of the conflict. The rest of the princes were in Luoyang at their respective height of power.

The conflict can be divided into two parts. The initial period (290–291) mainly concerns the power struggle between the Yang and Jia clans as they fought for control for Emperor Hui in the wake of his ascension. Sima Liang and Sima Wei were the only two of the Eight Princes involved, and fighting was only limited to coups in the capital, Luoyang. The later period (300–306) began following the fall of the Jia clan, who held power over the imperial court behind Emperor Hui for a decade before they were deposed by Sima Lun in 300. This period, particularly after Sima Lun's usurpation in February 301, escalated into a series of civil wars in northern China as Emperor Hui changed hands several times to the remaining six princes.

=== Family Tree ===
The Eight Princes

- – Emperors;
- – The Eight Princes
- - - - - - = The dashed line denotes an adoption

Sima Fang 司馬防 149–219
Sima Lang 司馬朗 171–217	Sima Fu 司馬孚 180–272; Prince Xian of Anping	Sima Yi 司馬懿 179–251; Emperor Xuan; Posthumous recognition	Sima Kui 司馬馗
Sima Wang 司馬望 205–271; Prince Cheng of Yiyang	Sima Gui 司馬瓌 d. 274; Prince Lie of Taiyuan	Sima Zhao 司馬昭 211–265; Emperor Wen; Posthumous recognition	Sima Liang 司馬亮 d. 291; Prince Wencheng of Runan	Sima Lun 司馬倫 d. 301; Prince of Zhao	Sima Shi 司馬師 208–255; Emperor Jing; Posthumous recognition	Sima Zhou 司馬伷 227–283; Prince Wu of Langya	Sima Tai 司馬泰 d. 299; Prince Wenxian of Gaomi
Sima Yong 司馬顒 d. 307; Prince of Hejian	Sima Yan 司馬炎 236–290; Emperor Wu r. 265–290	Sima You 司馬攸 248–283; Prince Xian of Qi	Sima Jin 司馬覲 256–290; Prince Gong of Langya	Sima Yue 司馬越 d. 311; Prince Xiaoxian of Donghai
Sima Zhong 司馬衷 259–307; Emperor Hui r. 290–307	Sima Wei 司馬瑋 271–291; Prince Yin of Chu	Sima Ai 司馬乂 277–304; Prince Li of Changsha	Sima Jiong 司馬冏 d. 303; Prince Wumin of Qi	Emperors of the Eastern Jin; 317–420
Sima Yu 司馬遹 278–300; Crown Prince; Minhuai	Sima Ying 司馬穎 279–306; Prince of Chengdu	Sima Yan 司馬晏 283–311; Prince Xiao of Wu	Sima Chi 司馬熾 284–313; Emperor Huai r. 307–311
Sima Ye 司馬業 300–318; Emperor Min r. 313–316

== Background ==
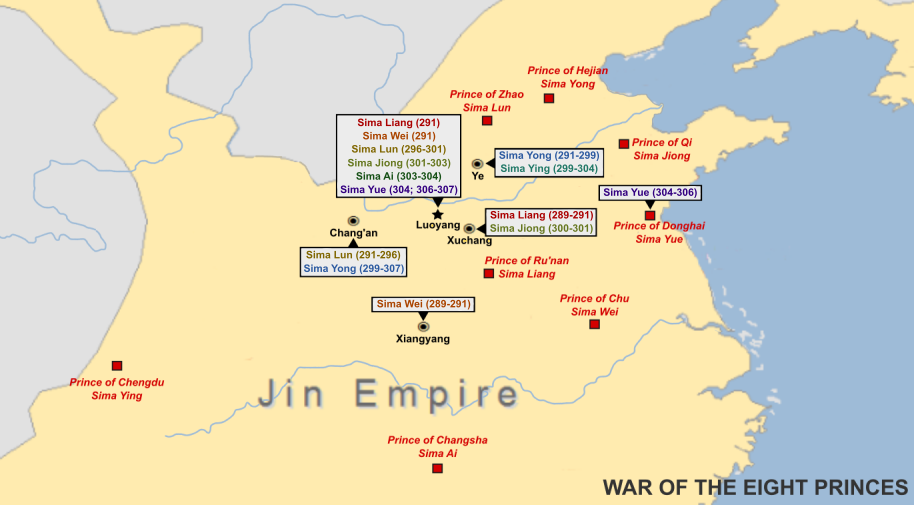
Map showing the Eight Princes, their fiefs and base of operations.

In early 249, Sima Yi, an official, general, and regent of the state of Cao Wei during the Three Kingdoms period, effectively seized control of Wei after instigating a successful coup against his co-regent, Cao Shuang. Sima Yi and two of his sons, Sima Shi and Sima Zhao, came to serve as the de facto rulers of Wei in succession, while the Wei emperors were reduced to puppet rulers. In February 266, Sima Zhao's eldest son, Sima Yan, also known as Emperor Wu of Jin, forced the Wei emperor Cao Huan to abdicate the throne and established the Jin dynasty.

The Sima clan sought to learn from the mistakes that led to the Cao Wei's downfall. The Wei regime had previously discouraged their princes from holding government and military offices, instead sending them away to live in their fiefs. Sima Yi, with the backing of the powerful gentry clans, was thus able to take control over the Wei government with minimal resistance. Identifying this issue, Sima Yan bolstered his family power by enfeoffing his uncles, cousins, and sons with their own private armies. As time passed, these princes and dukes were given administrative powers over their lands and were granted the power to levy taxes and employ central officials. Many were also entrusted with important military responsibilities and given the right to command troops outside of their fiefdoms. These members were assigned to guard key cities such as Chang'an, Ye and Xuchang, as well as the Jin capital, Luoyang.

Additionally, Emperor Wu's reign was troubled by a succession crisis as he and many other became aware that his heir Sima Zhong was developmentally disabled. A faction of ministers in court wanted Wu's younger brother, the abled Sima You, to replace him as the Crown Prince, but Wu was adamant in upholding the traditional succession law that the eldest living son should succeed, just as his father, Sima Zhao had done for him. (Note: To complicate matters, Sima You was not only Emperor Wu's full-brother; he was also their uncle Sima Shi's heir and successor, as Shi had no sons when he died. Thus, if You did become emperor, it would mean that that the throne had been passed to another branch of the Sima clan.) Zhong was strongly backed by both the influential Yang and Jia clans, being the son of Wu's first empress, Yang Yan and husband of Jia Nanfeng. Another factor for choosing Zhong was that Wu saw great potential in his grandson, Sima Yu, should he succeed Zhong in the future. In the end, Sima You's exile and untimely death in 283 effectively secured Sima Zhong's inheritance to the throne.

By empowering the princes, Emperor Wu intended for them to act as a safeguard for his successors should the gentry clans overstep their power, especially considering Sima Zhong's disability. He had hoped that his family members, by virtue of their familial ties, would cooperate with each other to protect the interests of their dynasty. However, after Sima Zhong took the throne and became a mere figurehead, the princes later proved themselves self-serving and willing to undermine one another for real control over the empire.

The War of the Eight Princes coincided with the upheaval of the so-called "Five Barbarians"; non-Chinese groups that had been resettling into the Chinese interior as far back as the Eastern Han dynasty. Through their civil wars and mismanagement of the empire, the Jin lost support from both the Chinese peasantry and the non-Chinese tribes, pushing them to join rebel groups in different parts of China. In 304, refugees from the Guanzhong led by the Ba Di founded the Cheng-Han dynasty in Sichuan, while the Five Divisions, descendants of the Southern Xiongnu, founded the Han-Zhao dynasty in Shanxi, thus beginning the Sixteen Kingdoms period. The princes also empowered the Xianbei tribes by employing them as auxiliaries in the final years of the conflict. South in the Yangtze region also saw the major rebellions of Zhang Chang and Chen Min, but these were ultimately suppressed.

== Prelude: Yang Jun (290-291) ==
=== Ascension of Emperor Hui ===
In late 289, Emperor Wu developed a deadly illness and considered appointing his father-in-law, Yang Jun, and his uncle, the Prince of Ru'nan, Sima Liang, as Sima Zhong's regent. While the emperor's health declined, Yang Jun had plans to monopolize his control over Zhong as consort kin. He first sent Sima Liang away to Xuchang through an edict and then launched a smear campaign against his court rival, Wei Guan, and forced him into retirement. Yang Jun also hid the emperor's final decree appointing him and Sima Liang as co-regents while his daughter, the empress Yang Zhi, issued another edict making her father the sole regent. Emperor Wu was aware of Yang Jun's manipulations, but was too ill to stop him.

On 16 May 290, Emperor Wu died, and Sima Zhong, posthumously known as Emperor Hui of Jin, ascended the throne. Yang Jun was instated as his regent while Yang Zhi was promoted to Empress Dowager. However, Yang Jun was not well received by his ministers due to his blatant attempts at consolidating power and refusal to accept advice. He also tried to assassinate Sima Liang without success and rejected suggestions to cooperate with him. Meanwhile, the new empress, Jia Nanfeng, was unhappy with the little control she has over state affairs due to Yang Jun and the Empress Dowager.

=== Fall of the Yang clan ===
Empress Jia enlisted the help of Sima Liang and the Prince of Chu, Sima Wei to overthrow Yang Jun. Liang was reluctant to help her, but Wei, who was stationed with military command in Jing province at the time, agreed and left for the capital, Luoyang with his troops. On the night of 23 April 291, Empress Jia and her allies sent out an imperial edict calling for the deposal of Yang Jun and occupied the gates leading to his residence. Yang Jun was caught by surprise and struggled to plan his next move. Meanwhile, Empress Dowager Yang Zhi tried to entice the soldiers to turn on Empress Jia, but failed and implicated herself in the process.

Soon, the soldiers advanced and set fire to the residence. Yang Jun's soldiers were routed, and he was killed while trying to escape. His families, supporters were all rounded up and executed as the extermination of all third degree relatives. Yang Zhi was spared but confined inside the palace, where she remained until her death in 292.

== Prince of Ru'nan, Sima Liang (291) ==
On 4 May 291, Sima Liang and Wei Guan were installed as the new regents of Emperor Hui. Now that he was in power, Liang asserted his authority by freely handing out new appointments and titles to around 1,081 people to garner support. At the same time, Empress Jia began placing her relatives and allies into positions of power.

Sima Liang and Wei Guan were wary of Sima Wei. Despite his role in the Yang clan's defeat, Sima Wei was notorious for his violent temperament. They attempted to strip him of his military power and send him back to his fief, but Wei retaliated by conspiring with Empress Jia to depose them, claiming to her that the two were planning to overthrow her. Soon, Empress Jia produced an edict from the emperor calling for the removal of Liang and Wei Guan. However, Wei was unsatisfied with the content of the original edict, as he was not included among the princes who had to raise their troops. Without the empress's knowledge, Wei forged an edict which made him Commander over all military forces and granted himself full control over the operation. On 26 July 291, he sent his subordinates and soldiers to arrest Liang and Wei Guan in Luoyang. Both men gave no resistance and were put to death.

== Prince of Chu, Sima Wei (291) ==
Sima Wei was a half-brother of Emperor Hui. With the forged edict in hand, he had essentially placed himself in total command over the empire's military. Immediately after executing Sima Liang and Wei Guan, he was advised to utilize his military authority to execute Empress Jia's powerful relatives, Jia Mi and Guo Zhang. However, Wei was hesitant in accepting this plan. In Empress Jia's camp, the minister, Zhang Hua urged her to punish Wei for killing the emperor's regents. Just one day after Liang's death, Empress Jia deployed her troops against Wei and spread doubt regarding the edict's authenticity among his soldiers. Deserted by his followers, Wei was captured and executed. His full-brother Sima Ai the Prince of Changsha, who provided support, was demoted to the lesser title of Prince of Changshan as punishment.

== Interlude: Empress Jia (291–300) ==
=== Power behind the throne ===
For the next nine years, Empress Jia ruled Jin in the emperor's name while entrusting power to her closest family members, most notably Jia Mi, and Guo Zhang. Despite the efforts of ministers like Zhang Hua and Pei Wei to uphold the government's functionality, the imperial court under the Jia clan was beset with widespread corruption and bribery. Rumors began to spread of Empress Jia's personal debauchery and tyrannical behavior, laying the seeds of discontent that would surface by the end of the decade.

Empress Jia also carried out a series of transfers that would influence the next stage of the War of the Eight Princes. In 296, a major tribal rebellion led by Qi Wannian broke out in Qin and Yong provinces under the watch of the Prince of Zhao and Emperor Hui's great-uncle, Sima Lun. Due to his failure to quell the uprising, Lun was recalled back to Luoyang. In 299, the Prince of Chengdu and half-brother of Emperor Hui, Sima Ying was assigned away to Ye following a heated argument he had with Jia Mi over the latter's treatment of the Crown Prince, Sima Yu. At the same time, the Prince of Hejian, Sima Yong, was transferred from Ye to the Guanzhong region in the west. Yong was a second cousin of Emperor Wu, but a grandson of the distinguished Sima Fu, and through the endorsement of the gentry clans he was entrusted to guard an important region.

The rebellion in Qin and Yong coincided with famines and plagues, and although it was ultimately put down in 299, it sparked an influx of refugees fleeing south to Yi province. It also allowed a Di leader, Yang Maosou to set up the state of Chouchi south of Tianshui in 296.

=== Coup of Sima Lun ===
Empress Jia deemed the Crown Prince, Sima Yu as a threat to her power should he ascend the throne, since he was not her biological son. In early 300, she orchestrated his arrest by convincing him while drunk to copy a text that said, amongst other things, that Emperor Hui should abdicate in favor of him. Empress Jia then presented the copied text to Emperor Hui, who then decided to place him under house arrest.

Since he was recalled to Luoyang, Sima Lun had climbed his way into Empress Jia's inner circle and was serving as tutor to the crown prince prior to his arrest. He also commanded some troops in the capital as general of the Right Army and was known to be "avaricious and false" as well as "simple and stupid," heeding only the advice of his confidant, Sun Xiu. Yu's arrest sparked outrage in the court, and a few officials approached Lun for his soldiers to overthrow Empress Jia.

Lun had long wished to betray the empress, but Sun Xiu convinced him to wait until Yu was truly out of the way, arguing that because of Lun's association with the empress, Yu may exact revenge on him if he were to ascend the throne. The duo spread rumours of a plot to restore Sima Yu before encouraging Empress Jia to eliminate him once and for all. The empress agreed and had Sima Yu assassinated.

With Sima Yu dead, many of the original conspirators decided to pull out while Sima Lun went ahead with the plan. He produced an edict allegedly from Emperor Hui calling for the removal of Empress Jia. On 7 May 300, he arrested the empress and put her under house arrest, and later forced her to commit suicide by drinking gold powered wine. He also executed many of her partisans, including Jia Mi, Zhang Hua and Pei Wei.

== Prince of Zhao, Sima Lun (300–301) ==
=== Usurping the throne ===
Sima Lun assumed regency over Emperor Hui, but delegated most of his power over to Sun Xiu. He and Sun Xiu plotted to take the throne by following the precedent of the Jin's foundation. They awarded their family members and allies with high-ranking positions and noble titles, while posthumously honoring Sima Yu and recruiting famous individuals into their administration to win the people's support. Yang Xianrong, a distant relative of Sun Xiu, was also installed as the new empress of Emperor Hui.

In autumn 300, after Sima Lun attempted to take his military authority away, the Prince of Huainan, Sima Yun rebelled against him with only 700 men in Luoyang. Lun was nearly killed in the fighting, but one of his supporters pretended to defect to Yun and killed him, ending his rebellion. The rebellion provided Lun and Sun Xiu with pretext to purge more of their court rivals and oppositions. Meanwhile, the Prince of Qi, Sima Jiong, who played a vital part in Empress Jia's arrest, was displeased with the positions he received under Lun's administration. In response, Lun had him assigned away to Xuchang.

Soon after, Lun was granted the Nine Bestowments. The following year, he claimed in a report that the spirit of his father, Sima Yi, had ordered him to move into the Western Palace (西宮), the residence of Emperor Hui. He then forged an edict stating the self-abdication of Emperor Hui and usurped the throne on 3 February 301.

During Sima Lun's regency, the Inspector of Yi Province, Zhao Xin, a relative of Empress Jia by marriage, rebelled in his province out of fear that he would be executed. Zhao Xin allied himself with the refugees from Qi Wannian's rebellion. However, in early 301, these refugees, led by the Ba Di leader, Li Te, ousted him from Chengdu and resubmitted to Jin.

=== Uprising of the Three Princes ===
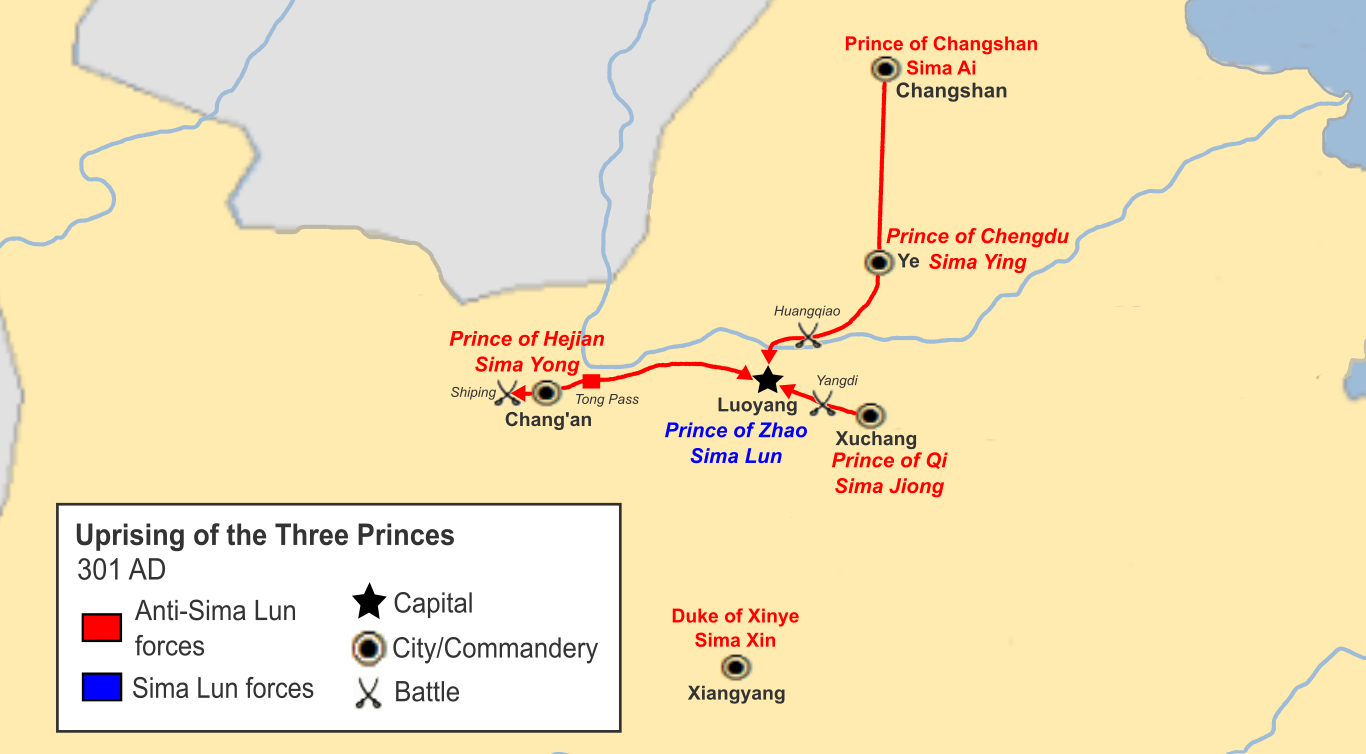
Uprising of the Three Princes, 301 AD.

Not long after his usurpation, Sima Jiong rebelled and sent out a proclamation to campaign against Sima Lun. The most important figure to accept his call was Sima Ying, a half-brother of Emperor Hui. He was described as beautiful but dull in the mind and did not read books, but he heeded his advisor Lu Zhi's advice to rally the people to his cause. Some 200,000 troops, including the forces of his other half-brother, the Prince of Changshan (later reappointed the Prince of Changsha), Sima Ai, were thus assembled near his base in Ye. In Chang'an, Sima Yong initially dispatched troops to support Lun but later sided with the coalition after learning that they were larger in size. Due to their strategic bases and command over vast armies, Jiong, Ying and Yong were collectively referred to as the "Three Princes" (三王) in records. Another notable participant of the coalition was the Duke of Xinye, Sima Xin, son of Sima Jun, a full brother of Sima Liang.

Lun sent Zhang Hong (張泓) and Sun Fu (孫輔) with 24,000 men to secure the passes and 30,000 under Sun Hui (孫會) to confront Ying. Zhang Hong fought Jiong at Yangdi (陽翟, modern Yuzhou, Henan) and defeated him several times before Jiong retreated and made camp at Yingyin (潁陰; in present-day Xuchang, Henan). However, one night, a disturbance occurred in Sun Fu's camp, causing him to flee back to Luoyang and claim that Zhang Hong was defeated. Lun recalled a segment of his army to defend Luoyang, but when news of Zhang Hong's recent victories reached him, he sent them out again to attack Sima Ying. However, by this time Jiong had reversed his early defeats and repelled Zhang Hong back to his camp.

Sun Hui led the main army against Ying at Huangqiao (黃橋, in present-day Wen County, Henan), defeating the prince's vanguard and killing 10,000. Ying planned to retreat and defend Zhaoge, but Lu Zhi advised him to carry out a surprise attack during the early morning. Sun Hui and his contemporaries were complacent by their recent victory and did not prepare any defense. Ying rallied his troops and returned with a counterattack, smashing Hui's forces north of the Yellow River. Ying's army was the first to make a breakthrough as they crossed the Yellow River to march on Luoyang.

As the coalition forces approached, officials and generals in the capital began to turn on Lun and Sun Xiu despite their attempts to suppress reports of their losses. The defeat at Huangqiao left Sun Xiu's camp greatly alarmed as they struggled to devise a plan in response. On 30 May 301, the general of the Left Guard led troops into the palace and arrested Lun. Sun Xiu and many of Lun's supporters were also captured and executed. Lun spent the next few days denouncing his own conduct before he was forced to commit suicide.

Emperor Hui was reinstated and celebrated the occasion with a five-day non-stop drinking binge. Ying was the first to reach the capital on 1 June, followed by Yong on 7 June. Jiong was still fighting Zhang Hong's forces at Yangdi at the time, so Ying had to send his soldiers to assist him. After Zhang Hong and his peers surrendered, Jiong entered the capital with "several hundred thousand armored soldiers, before whom the capital trembled in awe" on 23 July.

== Prince of Qi, Sima Jiong (301–303) ==
=== Regency ===
Sima Jiong was the son of Sima You and a cousin of Emperor Hui. On 11 August 301, he received the Nine Bestowments and was made regent of Emperor Hui. Jiong had intention to share his regency with Sima Ying, but through the advice of Lu Zhi, Ying withdrew to Ye to care for his ailing mother and handed over all major responsibility to Jiong. At Ye, Ying carried numerous popular policies to win over the people. He arranged for grain to be transported to the famine-stricken region of Yangdi, which had been devastated by war. He then had over 8,000 coffins constructed for high-ceremony funerals of those who had fallen in battle and over 14,000 of Sima Lun's soldiers to be buried. These were all Lu Zhi's ideas.

In May 302, the last of Emperor Hui's male descendants died, throwing the line of succession into confusion. Sima Jiong designated the Emperor's nephew, Sima Tan, as Crown Prince despite Sima Ying being a leading candidate. At the same time, Sima Yue, Prince of Donghai, was appointed to direct the Central Secretariat. Throughout his regency, Jiong alienated many of his ministers due to his arrogant and extravagant personality. He rarely visited the emperor and attended court meetings, and despite multiple attempts to get him to change his ways, he was reluctant to follow through his supporters' advices.

The minister, Wang Bao, was concerned about the various princes' military power, believing that they would one day use it against Jiong just as they did with his predecessors. In a letter to Jiong, Wang Bao urged him to send the princes back to their respective fiefs and to divide control over the state between him and Sima Ying. Jiong was initially convinced, but when the Prince of Changsha, Sima Ai, discovered the plan, he prompted Jiong to reject it and have Wang Bao executed.

Shortly after Lun's defeat in May 301, the court issued an edict ordering refugees in Yi province to return north. However, many of them, including Li Te, refused to comply with the edict. In winter 301, the provincial inspector, Luo Shang declared war against Li Te.

=== Conspiracy against Jiong ===
Sima Jiong wanted to appoint Li Han, one of Sima Yong's chief of staff, to be colonel of the Army of Readiness. Li Han was reluctant to accept the appointment due to his personal animosity with a few members of Jiong's cabinet, most notably Huangfu Shang. Instead, he fled back to his prince and conspired with him to rebel against Jiong. Yong was told to align himself with Sima Ying, offering him the role of Crown Prince due to his public support. He was also told to force Sima Ai, who was in Luoyang, into joining so that Jiong would unjustly punish him and provide justification to overthrow him.

In January 303, Yong rebelled and Ying was tempted to join him, despite opposition from Lu Zhi. Yong sent Li Han and Zhang Fang to campaign against Jiong, and they sent a proclamation ordering Ai to attack Jiong. Believing that Ai was involved, Jiong sent troops to kill him, who fled to the imperial palace for protection. There, using both imperial guards and his own personal forces, Ai defended the palace against Jiong within Luoyang for three days, bringing Emperor Hui along with him. On 27 January, Jiong's own officers betrayed him and he was captured and killed.

== Prince of Changsha, Sima Ai (303–304) ==
=== Control over the imperial court ===
Sima Ai seized control of the capital but willingly deferred authority to Sima Ying. The unexpected outcome of Ai and Jiong's battle put a halt to Sima Yong and Ying's ambitions, which frustrated the two princes. Ying in particular was unhappy with his restricted control over the state as he had to share power with Ai, and the relationship between the half-brothers gradually deteriorated in the coming months.

Ai's administration failed to deal with rebel movements in the empire. In the southwest, Li Te's rebellion raged on despite his death. Along the Changjiang, rebels consisting of refugees and draft evaders led by the Man leader, Zhang Chang took up arms. When the court ordered Sima Yong to campaign against Zhang Chang, he refused to move his troops. Later, when the Prince of Xinye, Sima Xin, asked for permission to send his troops out, Ai rejected his request, believing that Xin was colluding with Ying, who he had good relations with, and plotting to rebel. Xin was killed in battle by the rebels, and Zhang Chang's rebellion spread throughout the southern provinces.

Ai also continued to employ Huangfu Shang as an advisor, putting Li Han at unease. Shang had a brother, Huangfu Zhong, who was serving as the Inspector of Qin province all the while, which placed him in a position to threaten Sima Yong's rear. Yong and Li Han conspired to have him arrested, but Zhong saw through their plans and raised troops to attack Li Han. Ai wanted to defuse the situation by recalling Li Han to Luoyang and ordering Zhong to disperse his troops, However, Zhong refused and Li Han, with orders from Sima Yong, attempted to assassinate Ai. Though he discovered the plot and put Li Han to death, war was once again inevitable.

=== Siege of Luoyang ===
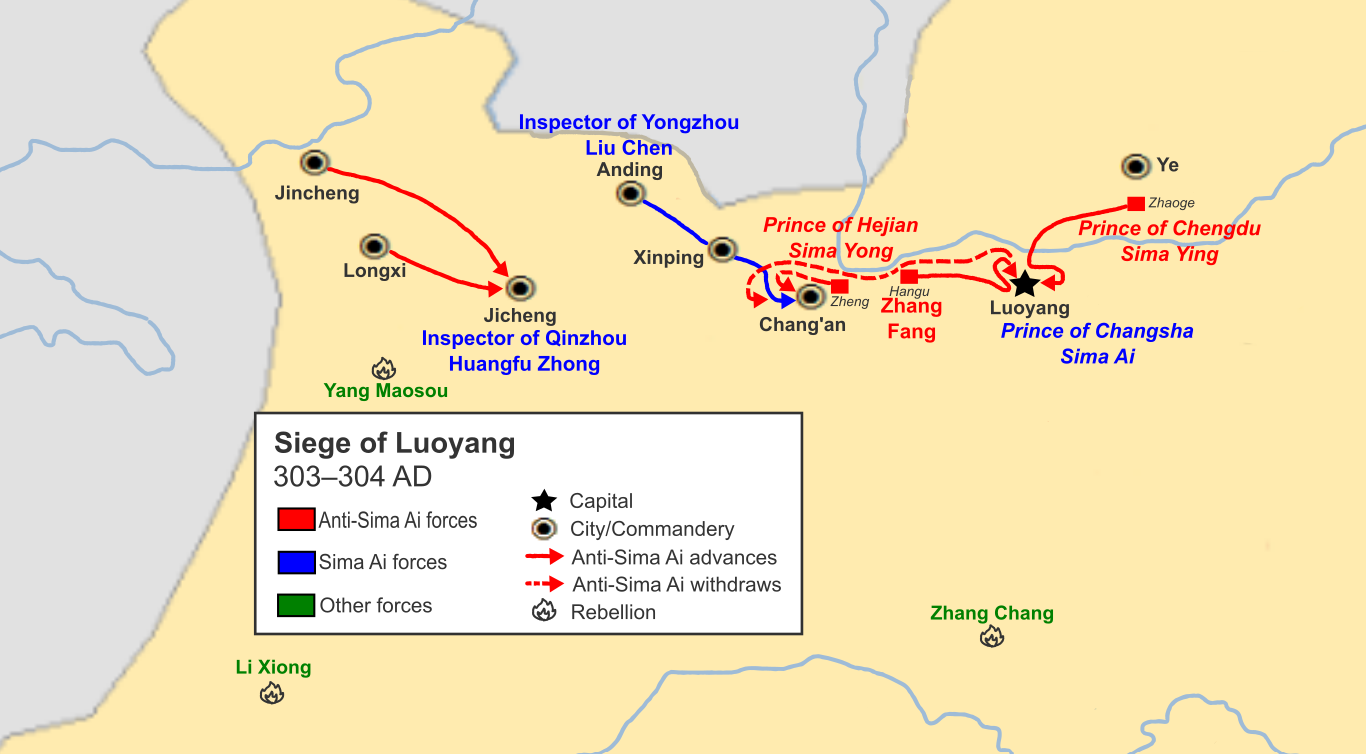
Siege of Luoyang, 303–304 AD.

After the failed assassination attempt, Yong began preparing his troops. At the time, Sima Ying was setting out to quell Zhang Chang's rebellion, but hearing about the situation in Luoyang and Guanzhong, he took his troops to join Yong instead, once again ignoring Lu Zhi's advice. In fall 303, Yong sent an army of 70,000 under Zhang Fang to attack the capital. Ying also sent an army 200,000 strong under Lu Ji against the capital.

Uncharacteristically, Emperor Hui commanded his own troops to help Sima Ai defend Luoyang. On 21 September 303, Ai sent 10,000 men under Huangfu Shang to oppose Zhang Fang, but he was defeated in a surprise attack. Zhang Fang momentarily broke through the city walls and carried out a mass plundering before withdrawing. Meanwhile, Emperor Hui was constantly on the move and shifting his base before he defeated Ying's troops at Goushi (緱氏; in present-day Yanshi District, Henan) on 22 October. However, when Shi Chao threatened his position at Goushi, he returned to the palace a few days later.

On 2 November, Ai's forces defeated Ying's army again outside of Luoyang. The next day, Ai brought with him Emperor Hui and personally confronted Lu Ji's army at the city gates. Ai's officers had several thousand cavalry equipped with double-ended halberds charge Lu Ji's forces, heavily defeating them. Many of Lu Ji's officers were killed, and the dead on his side reportedly laid in piles and clogged the river. Lu Ji managed to escape but was arrested and executed along with his family on Ying's orders.

Ai then moved west to face Zhang Fang. The emperor's presence caused panic within Zhang Fang's army, which was badly defeated and lost 5,000 soldiers. Zhang Fang rejected his subordinates' advice to retreat and instead secretly constructed ramparts during the night. Ai thought that Zhang Fang had been dealt with, but after realizing that the ramparts had been completed, he attacked them unsuccessfully.

Ai's officials attempted to negotiate peace with Ying, seeing that the two were brothers. However, when offered to split the empire between him and Ai, he rejected it. Ai personally wrote a letter to Ying to persuade him, but Ying would only accept it if Ai executed Huangfu Shang, which Ai refused to do.

Zhang Fang severed the Qianjin Dam (千金堨; northwest of Luoyang), effectively cutting off Luoyang's water supply. In response, Ai convinced the Inspector of Yong province, Liu Chen, to defect from Yong's side and attack Chang'an. He also sent Huangfu Shang out with an edict from the emperor to get the generals attacking Huangfu Zhong to disband, thus allowing him to send reinforcements to Luoyang. However, along the way, Huangfu Shang was captured and killed.

Ai held out in Luoyang until March 304, and by this point, Zhang Fang had given up hope of taking Luoyang and was planning to withdraw. Despite this fact, the Minister of Works, Sima Yue feared that Ai would not succeed in the long run. On March 17, he and a group of officials kidnapped and put Ai under house arrest. The next day, they opened the gates and surrendered to the enemy forces. However seeing how few of the opposing army remained, the capital troops regretted surrendering and secretly plotted to free Ai. Fearing the consequences should Ai escape, Yue sent Ai to Zhang Fang, who put Ai to the torch.

Although Ai was defeated, Yong was still threatened by Liu Chen, while Huangfu Zhong continued to resist in his lone city of Jicheng (冀城; in present-day Gangu County, Gansu). Yong recalled Zhang Fang to deal with Liu Chen, who had defeated a subordinate army on his way to Chang'an. On his way back, Zhang Fang seized over 10,000 slave women in Luoyang and cut them into mince meat to feed to his men. Liu Chen defeated Yong in succession, and 5,000 of his soldiers were able to break into Chang'an. However, he was slow to capitalize on his success, and the soldiers in Chang'an were eventually killed while Zhang Fang arrived just in time to defeat and capture him.

== Prince of Chengdu, Sima Ying (304–305) ==
=== Crown Prince ===
After Sima Ai's death, Sima Ying appointed himself Prime Minister and promoted Sima Yue to President of State Secretariat. Despite his new position, Ying kept Emperor Hui at Luoyang, leaving behind an army of 50,000 under Shi Chao while he returned to his base in Ye. On April 304, he imprisoned the empress, Yang Xianrong, and depose his nephew, Sima Tan from the position of Crown Prince. On 1 May, Ying was installed as Crown Prince and his power was described as being equal to that of Cao Cao during the end of the Han dynasty. Sima Yong was also appointed the Grand Governor and Grand Commander. As Crown Prince, Ying was said to have become more brazen and extravagant in his actions and was inclined towards favoritism, which lost him some of the goodwill from his supporters.

=== Battle of Dangyin ===
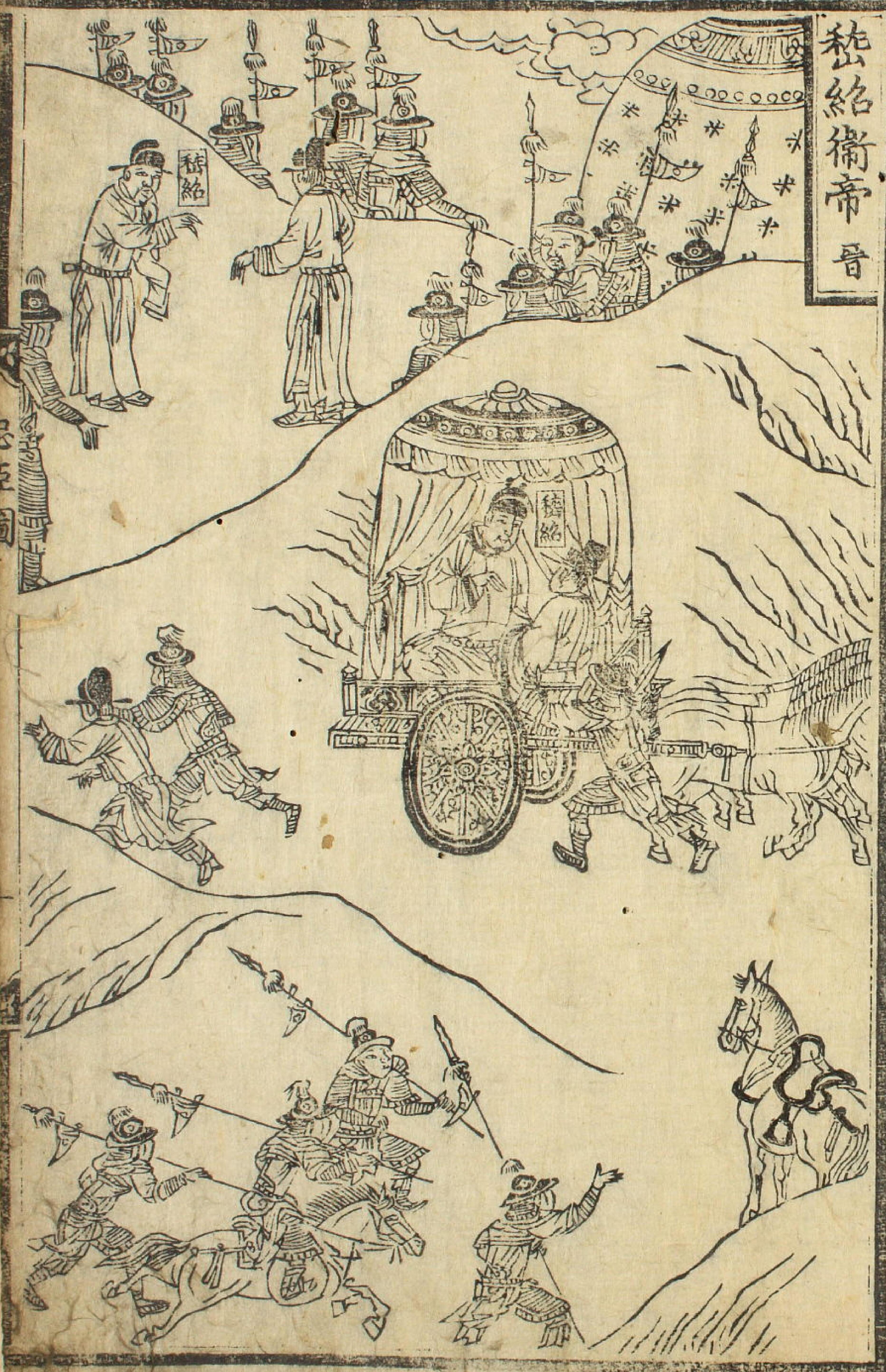
The Battle of Dangyin as depicted in the Samgang Haengsil-to (삼강행실도) from the Joseon era of Korea. The battle is best known for the sacrifice the attendant (and focus of this piece) Ji Shao made to protect Emperor Hui from Sima Ying's soldiers.

Sima Yue was another second cousin of Emperor Wu, but he and his three brothers (Sima Lüe, Sima Teng and Sima Mo) were renowned among their family for their talent and integrity. Yue took up several high-ranking offices in Luoyang and had close ties with the eminent families such as the Pei clan of Hedong and Wang clan of Langya. At the same time, Sima Lüe and Sima Teng were entrusted with guarding the provinces of Qing and Bing respectively.

On 17 August 304, Sima Yue rebelled in Luoyang, restoring Yang Xianrong and Sima Tan to their positions as Shi Chao and the others fled for Ye. He amassed an army of over 100,000 at Anyang and marched on Ying's capital, bringing with him Emperor Hui. Along the way, Yue was erroneously informed that the soldiers in Ye had scattered, so he prepared very little defense against the enemy. Shi Chao confronted Yue on 9 September, and defeated him heavily at the Battle of Dangyin. The emperor was wounded in battle and captured by Shi Chao. Yue fled to Xiapi and then to his fief in Donghai, while Yue's allies retreated back to Luoyang with Sima Tan.

=== Battle of Pingji and Sack of Ye ===
With Yue defeated, Ying then planned to eliminate the Chief Controller of You province, Wang Jun, a former partisan of Empress Jia who refused to join the coalition against Sima Lun. Ying sent a general to assassinate him, but when the plot was uncovered, Wang Jun rebelled and allied himself with the Inspector of Bing, Sima Teng. Wang Jun's army consisted of many Xianbei and Wuhuan soldiers due to his alliances with the neighbouring tribes, most prominently the Duan-Xianbei. In response, Ying sent generals out to oppose him.

Yong sent Zhang Fang to assist Sima Ying, but after learning Emperor Hui was in Ye, he ordered Zhang Fang to occupy Luoyang instead. Sima Tan was still holding the capital, although real power laid with his general, Shangguan Si (上官巳). Zhang Fang fought Shangguan Si and dealt him a great defeat, forcing them back into the city. One night, Tan led his troops to attack Shangguan Si and ousted him from Luoyang. He then welcomed Zhang Fang into Luoyang, but Zhang Fang soon deposed him and Yang Xianrong.

Ying had a general named Liu Yuan, who was a noble of the Five Divisions. The Five Divisions were descendants of the Southern Xiongnu in Bing province, and seeing that the princes were distracted by their civil war, they began plotting their rebellion. Liu Yuan convinced his prince to send him back to the Five Divisions so that he could rally and bring them as reinforcements against Wang Jun and Sima Teng. Instead, after arriving in Bing, the Five Divisions acclaimed Liu Yuan as their Grand Chanyu and later the King of Han. His forces swelled to over 50,000 and would continue to grow as both the Chinese peasants and non-Chinese tribes joined them in their resentment towards the Jin in light of the civil wars and famines.

Wang Jun and Sima Teng defeated Shi Chao's army at Pingji (平棘, in modern-day Zhao County, Hebei). As enemy forces reached the outskirts, the people of Ye were terrified and began fleeing. Lu Zhi urged Ying to use his remaining 15,000 armored troops to escort Emperor Hui of Jin back to Luoyang, but on the morning of their departure, the troops deserted. As there were no horses and porters, Ying and Emperor Hui had to flee on calf-drawn carts. Wang Jun's forces entered Ye and sacked the city in late September. His Xianbei troops partook in mass pillaging and abducted many women from the city.

In southwest China, Li Xiong, the son of Li Te, created the Ba Di state of Cheng-Han in 304. South of the Changjiang, despite his rebellion spilling over to multiple provinces, Jin forces were able defeat and capture Zhang Chang.

=== Captivity in Luoyang ===
Ying's party managed to reach Luoyang, but with very little troops, Zhang Fang was able to dominate him and take possession of Emperor Hui. For a brief period, Zhang Fang was in charge of state affairs. He remained with the in Luoyang for a few more months, but his soldiers were becoming restless and were suggesting him to move the emperor to Chang'an. On 14 December 304, Zhang Fang forced Emperor Hui to stay at the ramparts he built during his war with Sima Ai. With the emperor away, Zhang Fang's men looted the palaces in the capital. He also planned to burn them down as well, but was persuaded not to by Lu Zhi.

Three days later, Zhang Fang brought Emperor Hui, Ying and the others to Chang'an. Yong welcomed the emperor and placed him under his care. On 4 February 305, Yong issued an edict deposing Ying as Crown Prince and handed the position over to the Prince of Yuzhang, Sima Chi.

== Prince of Hejian, Sima Yong (305–306) ==
=== Western and Eastern Courts ===
Later, Sima Yong appointed Sima Yue as the Grand Tutor in hopes of resolving the conflict between their sides. Yong also granted Yue's brothers, Sima Lüe and Sima Mo military command in Luoyang and Ji province respectively. Yue declined his office, but for the time being, it appeared that the two sides had reached an agreement. Since Wang Jun had left Ye, Yue sent Mo to guard the city, while Lüe remained in his position as Commander over Qing province. Seeing that many parts of the empire have been devastated by warfare and rebellion, Yong issued an edict encouraging everyone to settle for peace. In another edict, he made himself Commander of all imperial military forces.

Although Emperor Hui was now in Chang’an, the influential ministers, Xun Fan, Liu Tun, and Zhou Fu, were left behind in Luoyang to run a separate court. Thus, there were two courts governing the empire, and Chang’an was referred to as the “Western Court” (西臺) while Luoyang was referred to as the “Eastern Court” (東臺). The Eastern Court reinstated Yang Xianrong as the empress, but the following year, she was deposed by Zhang Fang.

Since 303, Huangfu Zhong had resisted Sima Yong from Jicheng, even well after Sima Ai was executed. Around this time, he sent his son Huangfu Chang to meet with Sima Yue and request reinforcements. Yue denied his request, as he had only just made peace with Yong, so Chang went to Luoyang with a forged edict from Yue to entice a campaign against Yong. After restoring Yang Xianrong as empress, he claimed that she had ordered the officials in Luoyang to attack Zhang Fang and return the emperor to the old capital. They were initially willing to participate, but after learning that the edict was fabricated, they had Chang killed. Soon, the people of Jicheng killed Huangfu Zhong before surrendering, and Yang Xianrong was deposed again.

=== Uprising of the Eastern Armies ===
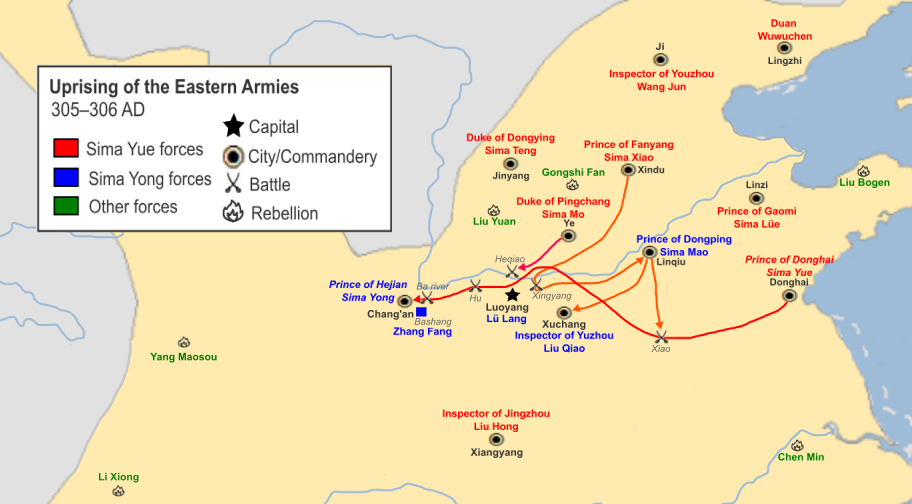
Uprising of the Eastern Armies, 305–306 AD.

In c.August 305, Sima Yue sent out a proclamation throughout the regions east of Luoyang calling for a campaign against Yong. He cited that Zhang Fang had forcibly moved Emperor Hui to Chang'an and aimed to bring him back to Luoyang. His brothers and several other governors such as Wang Jun and Sima Xiao all joined him. He also began handing out new appointments to his allies without the emperor's assent. Among the forces in the east, only the Inspector of Yu province, Liu Qiao and the self-declared Inspector of Yan province, Sima Mao sided with Sima Yong as Yue attempted to remove them from their positions in c.September.

In the Hebei region, where Sima Ying was still regarded as a revered figure, the people were upset by Yong's decision to remove him from power. Ying's general, Gongshi Fan took advantage of their resentment and rebelled. Among the people who joined him were a shepherd, Ji Sang and a former Jie slave, Shi Le. To quell his rebellion, Yong sent Sima Ying and Lu Zhi with 1,000 troops to Ye.

Liu Qiao sent his troops to block Yue from advancing west at Xiao County. On 20 November, Yong appointed Zhang Fang commander of 100,000 troops and sent him to assist Liu Qiao. Soon, Liu Qiao captured Xuchang from Sima Xiao, prompting him to flee to Ji province. Due to the early setbacks, a general of Yue, Chen Min, received permission to go east to recruit more soldiers. However, once there, Chen Min instead rebelled and took control of the Jiangnan region.

In Luoyang, another rebellion broke out which saw Yang Xianrong restored as empress, but it was quickly defeated and she was deposed once more. Seeing that she was being used as a political asset against him, Yong forged an edict from the emperor ordering the Eastern Court to execute her. However, he was opposed by Liu Tun and the others in Luoyang, and after failing to arrest Liu Tun, he changed his mind.

In Ji province, Sima Xiao received some elite Xianbei and Wuhuan cavalry forces from Wang Jun. With them, Xiao and his general, Liu Kun launched a successful counterattack on Yong and Liu Qiao's forces in January 306, killing Shi Chao at Xingyang. Xiao's forces then routed Sima Mao at Linqiu (廩丘, in present-day Puyang, Henan) and forced him to flee back to his fief in Dongping. Then, they won a great victory over Liu Qiao at Qiao Commandery, causing his army to collapse.

Early in 306, the administrator, Liu Bogen declared himself the Duke of Jian and briefly took over Qing province. He was swiftly defeated, but one of his followers, Wang Mi, escaped to Mount Zhangguang (長廣山; in present-day Pingdu, Shandong) and became a bandit, quickly gaining followers under his wing.

Following Liu Qiao's defeat, Yong was desperate settle for peace with Yue, but Zhang Fang advised him to keep fighting. In response, Yong had Zhang Fang executed and sent his head to Yue as part of a peace offer. Yue ignored it and used the head to convince Yong's other generals to surrender. He then sent his generals with Wang Jun's Xianbei troops towards Chang'an. Unable to stop them, Yong fled alone to Mount Taibai as the Xianbei soldiers sacked the city, killing around 20,000 people. On 11 June 306, Emperor Hui was sent back to Luoyang and arrived on 28 June. Yong soon returned and recaptured Chang'an, but at this point, the city was the only stronghold he had in control.

== Conclusion: Prince of Donghai, Sima Yue (306–311) ==
=== Death of Emperor Hui ===
Sima Yue was the last of the so-called Eight Princes to take control over the imperial court. After receiving Emperor Hui, Yue was appointed Grand Tutor and Manager of the Affairs of the Masters of Writing. On 8 January 307, Emperor Hui died after consuming poisoned bread. It is not clear if Yue was involved in his death. Emperor Hui was succeeded by his half-brother, Sima Chi, posthumously known as Emperor Huai.

Emperor Huai was regarded as an intelligent man, and compared to Emperor Hui, he had more say and was more active in handling state affairs. Yue supported Huai being on the throne, rejecting calls to have him replaced with the child Sima Tan and going as far as to having Tan executed. Yet, Yue was also wary of the new emperor's capabilities and was likely insecure about his own position due to the various coups and civil wars that led to the downfalls of his predecessors in recent years. In May 307, Yue left Emperor Huai at Luoyang for Xuchang, after which he assigned Sima Teng, Sima Mo and Sima Lüe to guard strategic locations throughout the empire; Teng was transferred to Ye in Hebei, Mo was garrisoned at Chang'an in Guanzhong, and Lüe was moved to Xiangyang in Jing province.

=== Death of Sima Ying ===
Previously, Sima Ying had been ordered to garrison at Ye to appease Gongshi Fan's rebels. However, he was unable to get through Luoyang due to Yue's forces and decided to return towards Chang'an. Following Yong's defeat, Yue issued an edict calling for Ying's arrest. Ying and Lu Zhi attempted to flee southward but were intercepted. They then planned to join Gongshi Fan, but Sima Xiao caught and apprehended the prince in Ye.

Around November or December 306, Sima Xiao died of natural causes. Xiao's advisor Liu Yu was concerned that his death would encourage the people of Ye to rebel with Ying as their leader. Therefore, he forged a false edict ordering the execution of Ying and killed him during the night. Lu Zhi buried Ying and took up a staff position with Sima Yue. Gongshi Fan was also defeated and killed by Yue's general, Gou Xi, but his subordinates, Ji Sang and Shi Le, escaped.

=== Death of Sima Yong ===
Sima Yong held out in Chang'an until around December 306 or January 307. Around this time, Yue sought for peace by issuing an edict to appoint Yong as Minister Over the Masses. Yong believed that Yue's intentions were genuine, and so he left Chang'an for Luoyang. However, along the way, he was intercepted by a general of Sima Mo at Xin'an, who had him strangled in his carriage.

== Aftermath ==
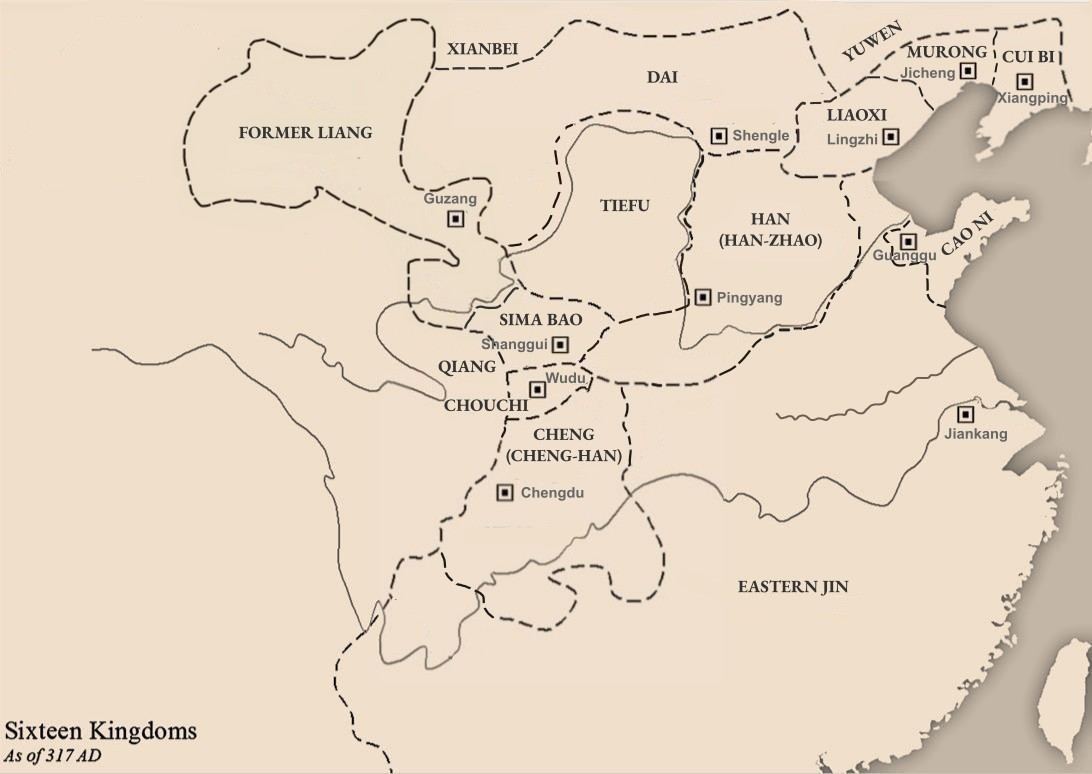
317 AD

Sima Yue's victory was short lived, as he now had to deal with the various rebellions going on throughout the empire. Chen Min was overthrown by the gentry clans of Jiangnan, who promptly surrendered the region back to Jin. Ji Sang and Shi Le sacked Ye in 307, killing Sima Teng in the process, while Wang Mi wreaked havoc on the North China Plain, going as far as occupying Xuchang and laying siege on Luoyang in 308. Although Yue eventually quelled their rebellions, both Shi Le and Wang Mi brought their remaining forces to join Liu Yuan's state of Han. Together, they overran most of the lands north of the Yellow River. In Sichuan, Jin forces failed to extinguish Li Xiong's state of Cheng.

Sima Yue returned to Luoyang in 309, during which he took measures to tighten his grip on the court. He sent 3,000 armoured soldiers to arrest and execute Emperor Huai of Jin's favored courtiers. Then, he dismissed the palace guards, who had participated in many previous coups, and replaced them with soldiers from his own fief. Around this time, Luoyang was hit by a deadly famine and attacked twice by Han forces. In response, Yue decided to march out with the 40,000-strong imperial army to camp at Xiang county (項縣; in present-day Shenqiu County, Henan) to actively campaign against Han, leaving the capital with little defense and despite Emperor Huai's objections. The emperor was also left behind in Luoyang under the watch of Yue's hand-picked confidants.

This decision was the breaking point in their relationship, as Huai began plotting to depose Yue. He made contact with Yue's second-in-command, Gou Xi, who also had a falling out with the prince, but their plans were eventually discovered. Yue wanted to attack Gou Xi, but was so overwhelmed by stress that he grew ill and soon died on 23 April 311. The imperial army, now at 100,000-strong, were unsure on how to proceed. They hastily chose Yue's minister, Wang Yan as a temporary leader, and decided that they should hold the prince's funeral first at his fief. However, the funeral procession was caught by Shi Le and defeated at the Battle of Ningping. The imperial army was annihilated, and the bodies of officials and soldiers were piled atop one another in a mound as not a single one had been able to escape. With the destruction of the main Jin force in the north, Han forces descended upon the poorly-defended and famine-stricken Luoyang, sacking the city and capturing Emperor Huai on 13 July 311; this came to be known as the Disaster of Yongjia. Gou Xi was also defeated and captured by Shi Le at Mengcheng County in October.

The Western Jin dynasty would survive for another five years, as an imperial restoration headed by Emperor Min of Jin (Emperor Huai's nephew) was founded in Chang'an soon after Huai's capture. However, that too fell by the end of 316, and the Sima clan eventually re-established itself as the Eastern Jin dynasty at Jiankang in southern China. Within four years of his victory in the War of the Eight Princes, Sima Yue had been hounded to death by an assortment of rebellions and court politics. Five years after his death, both the capitals of Chang'an and Luoyang had been lost and most of northern China fell under the rule of an assortment of short-lived states known as the Sixteen Kingdoms.

== See also ==
- The Eight Princes' family tree
- Sima clan family trees - including some of the Eight Princes
- Upheaval of the Five Barbarians

== Bibliography ==
- Barfield, Thomas (1989), The Perilous Frontier: Nomadic Empires and China, Basil Blackwell
- de Crespigny, Rafe (2004), Generals of the South
- de Crespigny, Rafe (2004b), Generals of the South 2
- de Crespigny, Rafe (2007), A Biographical Dictionary of Later Han to the Three Kingdoms, Brill
- de Crespigny, Rafe (2010), Imperial Warlord, Brill
- de Crespigny, Rafe (2017), Fire Over Luoyang: A History of the Later Han Dynasty, 23-220 AD, Brill
- di Cosmo, Nicola (2009), Military Culture in Imperial China, Harvard University Press
- Graff, David A. (2001), Medieval Chinese Warfare, 300-900, Routledge
- Graff, David A. (2016), The Eurasian Way of War: Military practice in seventh-century China and Byzantium, Routledge
- Lee, Peter H. (1992), Sourcebook of Korean Civilization 1, Columbia University Press
- Liang, Jieming (2006), Chinese Siege Warfare: Mechanical Artillery & Siege Weapons of Antiquity, Singapore, Republic of Singapore: Leong Kit Meng, ISBN 981-05-5380-3
- Lorge, Peter A. (2011), Chinese Martial Arts: From Antiquity to the Twenty-First Century, Cambridge: Cambridge University Press, ISBN 978-0-521-87881-4
- Lorge, Peter (2015), The Reunification of China: Peace through War under the Song Dynasty, Cambridge University Press
- Peers, C.J. (1990), Ancient Chinese Armies: 1500-200BC, Osprey Publishing
- Peers, C.J. (1992), Medieval Chinese Armies: 1260-1520, Osprey Publishing
- Peers, C.J. (1995), Imperial Chinese Armies (1): 200BC-AD589, Osprey Publishing
- Peers, C.J. (1996), Imperial Chinese Armies (2): 590-1260AD, Osprey Publishing
- Peers, C.J. (2006), Soldiers of the Dragon: Chinese Armies 1500 BC - AD 1840, Osprey Publishing Ltd
- Peers, Chris (2013), Battles of Ancient China, Pen & Sword Military
- Shin, Michael D. (2014), Korean History in Maps, Cambridge University Press
- Taylor, Jay (1983), The Birth of the Vietnamese, University of California Press
- Taylor, K.W. (2013), A History of the Vietnamese, Cambridge University Press
- Xiong, Victor Cunrui (2009), Historical Dictionary of Medieval China, United States of America: Scarecrow Press, Inc., ISBN 978-0810860537
- Wagner, Donald B. (2008), Science and Civilization in China Volume 5-11: Ferrous Metallurgy, Cambridge University Press

=== Diagram ===
- Sima's family tree of the Western Jin dynasty
