= Sima Xiao =

Sima Xiao 司馬虓

Prince of Fanyang (范阳王)
- Tenure: 31 August 278 - c.December 306
- Successor: Sima Li (Note: As Sima Xiao was sonless when he died, Sima Mo's son Sima Li was made Prince of Fanyang. Sima Li was later killed with Sima Mo at Chang'an.)
- Born: 270
- Died: c.December 306 (Note: Both Emperor Hui's biography in Book of Jin and vol.86 of Zizhi Tongjian recorded that Sima Xiao died before Sima Ying in the same month (10th month of the 1st year of the Guang'xi era). The month corresponds to 22 Nov to 21 Dec 306 in the Julian calendar.)
- Issue: None
- House: Jin dynasty
- Father: Sima Sui

Sima Xiao (司馬虓; 270 - c.December 306), courtesy name Wuhui (武会), was a Western Jin imperial prince. He was a cousin of Sima Yue, Prince Xiaoxian of Donghai, a regent for Emperor Hui and Emperor Huai, and sided with Sima Yue when Yue became active in the War of the Eight Princes.

== Background ==
Sima Xiao was the son of Sima Sui (司馬绥; posthumously known as Prince Kang of Fanyang (范阳康王)), who was the youngest son of Sima Yi's brother Sima Kui (司馬馗), making Xiao a second cousin of Jin's founding emperor Emperor Wu. Sima Sui was a younger brother of Sima Tai (司馬泰; posthumously known as Prince Wenxian of Gaomi (高密文献王)), father of Sima Yue, Sima Teng, Sima Lue and Sima Mo.

When Sima Sui died in August 278, (Note: Sima Sui's biography in Book of Jin recorded that he was appointed Prince of Fanyang when Emperor Wu ascended the throne (in February 266), was Prince of Fanyang for about 15 years and died in 279. (泰始元年受封，在位十五年。咸宁五年薨，...) Jin Shu, vol.37. The record of Sima Sui dying in 279 is in conflict with the record found in the annals of Emperor Wu in the same work.) Sima Xiao inherited the title of Prince of Fanyang at the age of eight. When Sima Xiao was young, he was noted to be studious and articulate in conversations. Among members of the Sima clan, he, his cousin Sima Mo (Prince of Nanyang), and Sima Rui (the future Emperor Yuan) were praised.

== During Emperor Hui's reign ==
In May 290, when Sima Xiao was about 20 years old, Emperor Wu died. Emperor Wu's successor, Emperor Hui was developmentally disabled; his reign saw a series of regents who ruled on his behalf. Xiao's activities during the regencies of Yang Jun (father of Emperor Wu's second wife Empress Yang Zhi), Sima Liang and Wei Guan (who were co-regents), Empress Jia Nanfeng (Emperor Hui's first wife) and Sima Lun (Prince of Zhao) were poorly documented.

=== War of the Eight Princes ===
After Sima Jiong was executed after a battle against Sima Ai in January 303, Liu Kun and his family went to serve Sima Xiao. While Emperor Hui of Jin was held hostage in Chang'an, Sima Xiao approached Zu Ti and invited Zu to serve him, but he declined.

In c.August 305, Sima Yue sent out a proclamation throughout the regions east of Luoyang calling for a campaign against Sima Yong. He cited that Zhang Fang had forcibly moved Emperor Hui to Chang'an and aimed to bring him back to Luoyang. His brothers and several other prominent governors such as Wang Jun and Sima Xiao all joined him, and he also began handing out new appointments to his allies without the emperor's assent. Among the forces in the east, only the Inspector of Yu province, Liu Qiao and the self-declared Inspector of Yan province, Sima Mao sided with Sima Yong after Yue attempted to remove them from their positions in c.September, with Liu Qiao accusing the prince of overstepping his authority.

Liu Qiao sent his troops to block Yue from advancing west at Xiao County. On 20 November, Yong appointed Zhang Fang commander of 100,000 troops and sent him to assist Liu Qiao. Soon, Liu Qiao captured Xuchang from Sima Xiao, prompting him to flee to Ji province. Due to the early setbacks, a general of Yue, Chen Min, received permission to go east to recruit more soldiers. However, once there, Chen Min instead rebelled and took control of the Jiangnan region.

In Ji province, Sima Xiao received some elite Xianbei and Wuhuan cavalry forces from Wang Jun. With them, Xiao and his general, Liu Kun launched a successful counterattack on Yong and Liu Qiao's forces in January 306, killing Shi Chao at Xingyang. Xiao's forces then routed Sima Mao at Linqiu (廩丘, in present-day Puyang, Henan) and forced him to flee back to his fief in Dongping. Then, they won a great victory over Liu Qiao at Qiao Commandery, causing his army to collapse.

After Sima Yue defeated Sima Yong later in 306 and welcomed Emperor Hui back to Luoyang on 28 June, for his merits in the war, in c.September 306, Sima Xiao was appointed Minister of Works and transferred to Yecheng.

After his victory, Sima Yue put out an order for Sima Ying's arrest, and Sima Ying fled with his sons Sima Pu (司馬普) the Prince of Lujiang and Sima Kuo (司馬廓) the Prince of Zhongdu, attempting to flee to Gongshi Fan (公師藩), when he was intercepted by Feng Song (馮嵩) the governor of Dunqiu Commandery (頓丘, roughly modern Puyang, Henan) and taken to Yecheng. Sima Xiao imprisoned Sima Ying but did not wish to kill him.

== Death ==
Sima Xiao died of a sudden illness at Yecheng in c.December 306, just about two months after his appointment. After his death, his secretary Liu Yu (brother of Liu Kun), worried that there were still many of Sima Ying's supporters in the city, forged an edict ordering Sima Ying to commit suicide. Sima Ying's two sons were also killed with him.
