= Sima Xin (Hongshu) =

Prince Zhuang of Xinye (died 303)

Sima Xin 司馬歆

Prince of Xinye (新野王)
- Reign: 11 August 301 – June 303
- Successor: Sima Shao (司马劭)
- Born: c.270s
- Died: June 303; Fancheng, Hubei
- Issue: None
Names
- Family name: Sima (司馬); Given name: Xin (歆); Courtesy name: Hongshu (弘舒)
Posthumous name
- Zhuang (庄)
- House: House of Sima
- Father: Sima Jun
- Mother: Lady Zang

Sima Xin (simplified Chinese: 司马歆; traditional Chinese: 司馬歆; died June 303), courtesy name Hongshu (弘舒), posthumously known as Prince Zhuang of Xinye (新野庄王), was a son of Sima Jun and his wife or concubine Lady Zang, and a grandson of Sima Yi, regent of the Cao Wei state during the Three Kingdoms era. Besides his heritage, Sima Xin was best known for his involvement in the War of the Eight Princes during the reign of his cousin's son, Emperor Hui of Jin, and his death during Zhang Chang's rebellion.

== Background and life under Emperor Wu ==
Sima Xin was born to Sima Jun, Prince Wu of Fufeng, and Lady Zang in an unknown year; he was the most well known among Sima Jun's ten sons, along with his elder brother Sima Chang. When Sima Jun died in November 286, Sima Chang requested for his father's fiefdom to be divided so that Sima Xin may have his own fief. Later, towards the end of the Taikang era (c.287 - 289), Sima Xin was made Duke of Xinye County, with a fiefdom of 1800 households, and he was allowed privileges accorded to the higher rank of county prince.

== During Emperor Hui's reign ==
In May 290, Sima Xin's cousin Emperor Wu of Jin died. Emperor Wu's successor, Emperor Hui was developmentally disabled; his reign saw a series of regents who ruled on his behalf. Sima Xin's activities during the regencies of Yang Jun, his uncle Sima Liang and Wei Guan (who were co-regents), and Emperor Hui's wife Empress Jia Nanfeng, were poorly documented. During this period, his mother Princess Dowager Zang died, and he acted appropriately for a mourning son and was thus known for his filial piety.

When Sima Xin's uncle Sima Lun overthrew Jia Nanfeng's regency in May 300, Sima Xin was not recorded to have any objections. However, when Sima Lun declared himself emperor in February the following year, many other Jin imperial princes began forming a coalition to overthrow Sima Lun. Initially, Sima Xin was hesitant when the son of his cousin Sima You, Sima Jiong (Prince of Qi), invited him to join the coalition. His favorite Wang Sui (王绥) advised, "(The Prince of) Zhao is powerful as he has many relations, while (the Prince of) Qi is weak due to his lack of relations. My lord should side with Zhao." Sima Xin's staff officer Sun Xun exclaimed, "The Prince of Zhao is treasonous, and all under heaven should band together and kill him. What "strengths", "weaknesses" and "relations" are there to speak of?" Sima Xin decided to join Sima Jiong. Sima Xin sent Sun as a messenger to Sima Jiong. When they met, Sima Jiong held Sima Xin's hands and remarked, "The one who allowed me to accomplish this honourable deed, is the Duke of Xinye." When Sima Jiong attacked Luoyang, Sima Xin took to the field as well, leading his troops to act as a guide for Jiong. Due to his contributions, in August, Sima Xin's peerage was promoted to the Prince of Xinye, with a fiefdom of 20000 households. He was also appointed Chief Controller of Jingzhou and Grand General who Stabilizes the South.

=== Zhang Chang's rebellion ===
At the turn of the fourth century CE, many refugees entered Yizhou to flee Qi Wannian's rebellion, famine and plague in the Guanzhong region. In 301, the Jin court ordered these refugees to return home, believing the Guanzhong to be stable again. Zhang Chang, an Imperial Secretary at the time, became tasked with supervising the refugees with their return. However, the plan fell through as the refugees, led by Li Te, revolted in Yizhou against the court's order.

The rebellion continued into 303. By this time, Sima Xin was Chief Controller of Jingzhou. His administration over the province was strict and harsh, with the ethnic minority tribes bearing the brunt. Zhang Chang, a tribesman himself, went into hiding for half a year. He began recruiting thousands of followers under his wing with the intention to rebel. He used a stolen army banner and pretended to recruit soldiers to fight Li Liu (Li Te's brother who took over his rebellion after Te died in c.March) in Yizhou.

In June 303, the Jin court issued the "Renwu Draft" (壬午兵), which ordered the drafting of men to fight against Li Liu's rebellion. The draft was negatively received, as many did not want to travel deep into Yizhou to fight, and officials in the south began forming outlaw gangs to evade the draft. Many refugees were also entering Jiangxia Commandery due to an abundant harvest there. These factors prompted Zhang Chang to step out of hiding and begin his rebellion. Zhang Chang changed his name to Li Chen (李辰) and recruited more followers at Mount Shiyan (石巖山; in present-day Anlu, Hubei). Many of the draft evaders and refugees flocked to him, thus increasing his numbers. The Administrator of Jiangxia, Gong Qin (弓欽), campaigned against Zhang Chang but to no avail. Zhang Chang then attacked Jiangxia's capital and forced Gong Qin to flee, placing the commandery under his command. Zhang Chang also repelled an attack by Sima Xin's general, Jin Man (靳滿).

Soon, Zhang Chang spread a rumour claiming that the Jin court had sent a large army to kill everyone, seeing that all in the south had risen in revolt. Zhang Chang's ruse spread quickly and instilled fear in many southerners. Those living between the Han and Yangzi rivers joined Zhang Chang quickly, and within a month, Zhang Chang amassed an army of 30,000 strong. Zhang Chang's followers wore crimson hats on their heads and horse tails as beards.

Sima Xin sent the Jin court a petition requesting reinforcements. The court dispatched the generals, Liu Hong and Liu Qiao, to assist Sima Xin. Zhang Chang's general, Huang Lin (黃林), led 20,000 soldiers to invade Yuzhou, but Liu Qiao defeated him.

Sima Xin sent another petition to the court, this time asking permission to set out and campaign against Zhang Chang. However, the emperor's regent, Sima Ai, was suspicious of Sima Xin's motives and believed Xin wanted to collude with the Prince of Chengdu, Sima Ying, to form a coalition against him. Therefore, Sima Ai rejected the petition. Meanwhile, Zhang Chang's army continued to grow. Sima Xin was conflicted on whether to march out or stay in his position. When Zhang Chang reached Sima Xin's base in Fancheng, Sima Xin chose to go out and fight, but his army scattered, and the rebels killed him. After his death, Sima Shao (司马劭), a son of his elder brother (probably Sima Chang), was made his heir; Sima Shao was eventually captured and presumably killed by Shi Le in 311, either in the aftermath of Sima Yue's death or during the Disaster of Yongjia.
