= Shi Chao =

Western Jin dynasty general (died January 306)

- 石超

General Who Uplifts Military Might (奮武將軍)
- In office 304–?
- Monarch: Emperor Hui of Jin

Personal details
- Born: Unknown Cangzhou, Hebei
- Died: January 306 Xingyang, Henan
- Relations: Shi Bao (grandfather); Shi Chong (uncle); Shi Xi (brother)
- Parent: Shi Qiao (father)

Shi Chao (died January 306) was a military general of the Jin dynasty (266–420). He was active during the War of the Eight Princes, siding with the Prince of Chengdu, Sima Ying, and the Prince of Hejian, Sima Yong. He participated in numerous key conflicts throughout the civil war before dying in battle in early 306.

== Life ==
=== Background ===
Shi Chao was a native of Nanpi County in Bohai Commandery and the son of the Jin official, Shi Qiao (石喬). His grandfather, Shi Bao, and uncle, Shi Chong, were influential ministers of Jin. In 300, the Prince of Zhao, Sima Lun launched a coup in the capital, Luoyang and became Emperor Hui of Jin's regent. Later, Sima Lun's powerful advisor, Sun Xiu framed Shi Chong and Shi Qiao for conspiring against the regime and had them executed. Shi Chao and his brother, Shi Xi (石熙), were able to sense the danger beforehand, so they escaped Luoyang before they could be killed. They went to Yecheng, where Shi Chao offered his service to the Prince of Chengdu, Sima Ying, and became his General Who Breaks and Charges.

=== Coalition against Sima Lun ===
In 301, after Sima Lun usurped the throne, the Prince of Qi, Sima Jiong started a coalition to restore Emperor Hui. Sima Ying joined the coalition and appointed Shi Chao as one of his vanguard generals. In response, Sima Lun sent his generals, Sun Hui (孫會), Shi Yi (士猗) and Xu Chao (許超) to intercept Sima Ying's army with 30,000 soldiers. At Huangqiao (黃橋, in present-day Wen County, Henan), the vanguard troops led by Zhao Xiang (趙驤) were initially defeated by Shi Yi and Xu Chao. However, Shi Chao and the others later attacked and defeated Sima Lun's army at the Gu River (湨水; southeast of present-day Jiyuan, Henan), causing his generals to abandon their soldiers and flee.

In May 301, Sima Lun was overthrown in a coup, and Sima Ying would occupy Luoyang the following month. However, Sima Jiong was still struggling against Zhang Hong (張泓) and others at Yangdi (陽翟, modern Yuzhou, Henan). Sima Ying sent Shi Chao and Zhao Xiang to assist him, and after they arrived, all of Sima Lun's generals surrendered. For his contributions, Shi Chao was made a marquis. In 303, he was appointed General of Inspiring Martial Might to help subjugate the Jingzhou rebel, Zhang Chang, but before he and Sima Ying's other generals could act, the rebellion was quickly put down.

=== Campaign against Sima Ai ===
Shortly after, Sima Ying and the Prince of Hejian, Sima Yong began a campaign against the Prince of Changsha, Sima Ai, who was acting as Emperor Hui's regent in Luoyang. Shi Chao was made Central Protector of the Army and placed under the command of Lu Ji to attack Luoyang. When Emperor Hui moved his army to Goushi (緱氏; in present-day Yanshi District, Henan), Shi Chao advanced towards him and prompted him to retreat. Later, Lu Ji's forces were badly defeated at the Jianchun Gate (建春門) by Sima Ai, resulting in high casualties and several generals captured, but Shi Chao was able to escape the scene.

Sima Ai was eventually arrested and executed in 304, leading to Sima Ying becoming Prime Minister and Crown Younger Brother. While Sima Ying stayed in Yecheng, he appointed Shi Chao as General Who Uplifts Military Might before sending him and the other generals with 50,000 soldiers to occupy the twelve gates of Luoyang.

=== Battle of Dangyin and war with Wang Jun ===
However, not long after Sima Ai's defeat, the Prince of Donghai, Sima Yue raised an army to campaign against Sima Ying. One of his allies, Chen Zhen (陳眕), brought his army to the Yunlong Gate (雲龍門) in Luoyang and issued an edict to inform the ministers and people to prepare for the campaign. Shi Chao was still in Luoyang at the time, and he once again fled to Sima Ying.

As Sima Yue's coalition approached Yecheng, Sima Ying sent Shi Chao with 50,000 men to oppose them. Shi Chao was able to catch Sima Yue by surprise and routed him at Dangyin, also killing the general Ji Shao. He also managed to capture Emperor Hui, who had followed Sima Yue on the campaign, and sent him to Yecheng. Although Yue was defeated, Sima Ying was then threatened by an alliance between the Chief Controller of Youzhou, Wang Jun and the Duke of Dongying, Sima Teng. Sima Ying sent Shi Chao to resist them, but he was defeated by Wang Jun's general, Qi Hong, at Pingji (平棘, in modern day Zhao County, Hebei).

=== Death ===
Wang Jun and Sima Teng captured Yecheng, forcing Sima Ying and his officials to escape to Luoyang with only a few men. While he was defending Yecheng, Sima Yong had sent his army to occupy Luoyang, so after he arrived at the city, Yong stripped him of his power. Thus, Sima Ying and his subordinates, including Shi Chao, were placed under Sima Yong's command. In 305, Sima Yue formed a coalition against Sima Yong after the latter forcibly moved Emperor Hui from Luoyang to Chang'an. Sima Yong sent Shi Chao to assist his ally, Liu Qiao in Yuzhou by acting as his reserves in Heqiao (河穚; southwest of present-day Mengzhou, Henan). In January the following year, Shi Chao fought Sima Yue's forces led by the Prince of Fanyang, Sima Xiao and Liu Kun at Xingyang, but was killed in battle.
