= Liu Yu (Western Jin) =

- 劉輿

Chief Clerk of the Left (左長史)
- In office 306 – 310
- Monarch: Emperor Hui of Jin / Emperor Huai of Jin

Personal details
- Born: 265
- Died: 311
- Relations: Liu Kun (younger brother); Sima Lun's daughter-in-law (younger sister)
- Children: Liu Yan; Liu Yin; Liu Yi; Liu Qi; Liu Shu
- Parents: Liu Fan (father); Lady Guo (sister of Guo Yi and niece of Guo Huai) (Note: Liu Yu's biography in Book of Jin recorded that both he and Liu Kun were maternal nephews of Guo Yi.) (mother)
- Courtesy name: Qingsun (慶孫)
- Posthumous name: Zhen (貞)
- Peerage: Marquis of Dingxiang (定襄侯)

Liu Yu (265 – 311), courtesy name Qingsun, was an official of the Jin dynasty (266–420). He was the elder brother of the famous general, Liu Kun. A famous celebrity in his youth, Liu Yu and his family became deeply involved in the War of the Eight Princes. After the civil war, he served as a top advisor for the Prince of Donghai, Sima Yue, during which he notably recommended Liu Kun to the position of Inspector of Bing province. While a talented and diligent advisor, Liu Yu was also criticized for his sycophancy.

== Early life and background ==
Liu Yu was the son of the Household Counsellor, Liu Fan (劉蕃) and Lady Guo, who was the sister of the Master of Writing, Guo Yi (郭奕). Described as handsome and exceptionally talented, he and his younger brother, Liu Kun were famous scholars during their time, with the people of Luoyang often referring to them as "The Radiance of Luoyang: Qingsun and Yueshi". The brothers were also close associates of the prominent ministers, Jia Mi and Shi Chong, and became members of a celebrity group called the "Twenty-Four Friends of Jingu (二十四友)”. Liu Yu in particular was known for his calligraphy, with the Liang dynasty calligraphy critic, Yu Jianwu, positively listing his work as "middle lower rank" in his book, the Shupin (書品; "Classification of Calligraphy"). Early in his career, Liu Yu was serving in the Prime Minister's office as a Gentleman of Writing.

== War of the Eight Princes ==
=== Service under Sima Lun and Sima Jiong ===
In 300, the Prince of Zhao, Sima Lun overthrew and killed Emperor Hui's regent and wife, Empress Jia Nanfeng, along with Jia Mi, Shi Chong and their partisans. Liu Yu's family were spared, though he and Liu Kun were removed from office by the prince's chief advisor, Sun Xiu, who the brothers had long despised. However, Liu Yu's sister was married to Sima Lun's heir, Sima Fu (司馬荂), who also did not like Sun Xiu, and with Sima Fu's help, Liu Yu was reinstated as a Regular Mounted Attendant.

In 301, Sima Lun usurped the throne from Emperor Hui, which was immediately opposed by a military coalition led by the three princes (Prince of Qi, Sima Jiong, Prince of Chengdu, Sima Ying and Prince of Hejian, Sima Yong). During the war, Sun Xiu wanted Sima Fù (司馬馥) and Sima Qian (司馬虔) to lead out troops and assist in the defence, but they refused. As Sima Qian was fond of Liu Yu, Sun Xiu sent Liu Yu to persuade him, who finally agreed to lead 8,000 troops as reinforcements.

Sima Lun was eventually defeated that same year, and Emperor Hui was reinstated with Sima Jiong as his regent. Though they had sided with an usurper, Sima Jiong appreciated Liu Yu and his family's talents, so he spared them and appointed Liu Yu as an Assistant to the Imperial Counsellor. After Sima Jiong was killed in a coup two years later, Liu Yu and his family went to serve the Prince of Fanyang, Sima Xiao.

=== Uprising of the Eastern Armies ===
In 305, the Prince of Donghai, Sima Yue formed a coalition against the Prince of Hejian, Sima Yong for forcibly moving Emperor Hui from Luoyang to Chang'an. Sima Xiao sided with Sima Yue, and after he was appointed Inspector of Yu province, he made Liu Yu the new Administrator of Yingchuan. However, the original Inspector of Yu, Liu Qiao, refused to accept his replacement, stating that the appointment was not authorized by the emperor. As Liu Yu was a confidant of Sima Xiao, Liu Qiao submitted a memorial accusing Liu Yu and Liu Kun of crimes, such as coercing Sima Xiao into disobeying imperial orders and their past associations with Sima Lun.

Sima Yong supported Liu Qiao's claims, sending out reinforcements to assist him and offering to reward anyone for Liu Yu and Liu Kun's heads. Liu Qiao took advantage of the situation to capture the key city, Xuchang in Yu province. Liu Kun attempted to relieve the city but failed, so he, Liu Yu and Sima Xiao all fled to Hebei while Liu Fan and Lady Guo were captured by the attackers. Liu Kun returned later that year to reclaim the city and rescued their parents.

In 306, Sima Xiao was appointed the Minister of Works and garrisoned at Ye to formally take charge of Ji province. Liu Yu was also appointed as General Who Attacks Barbarians and Administrator of Wei Commandery. Months after his appointment, however, Sima Xiao died in office. All the while, the Prince of Chengdu, Sima Ying was imprisoned at Ye and was deeply popular among the people of Hebei. Fearing rebellion, Liu Yu kept Sima Xiao's death a secret and forged an imperial edict ordering for Sima Ying's execution. During the night, Liu Yu had Sima Ying and his two sons killed.

== Service under Sima Yue ==
Sima Yue summoned Liu Yu to serve in his staff, but the prince was also told by someone, "Liu Yu is a greasy fellow; getting too close to him will corrupt you." Thus, when Liu Yu arrived, Sima Yue was initially wary of him. Secretly, Liu Yu studied the military registers, granaries, cattle, horses, weapons, and the layout of the land and rivers. Due to the civil wars, the military and government were in disarray, and almost everyone including Sima Yue's Chief Clerk, Pan Tao (潘滔) did not know how to resolve these issues. Only Liu Yu was able to provide Sima Yue with eloquent advice, and the prince began to treat him with great respect. Sima Yue appointed him as his Chief Clerk of the Left and entrusted him with all military and state affairs. Liu Yu was also enfeoffed the Marquis of Dingxiang.

During this period, the rebel state of Han-Zhao occupied Bing province and was running rampant over northern China. Liu Yu persuaded Sima Yue to appoint Liu Kun as the new Inspector of Bing province to secure their northern border. As Sima Yue consolidated his control over the government, Liu Yu was made one of his top advisors, and people at the time often said that the three talents of Sima Yue's household were Pan Tao, Liu Yu and Pei Miao (裴邈). Liu Yu worked day and night attending to guests and sorting out documents. His abilities were widely admired, and he was compared to the Han dynasty minister, Chen Zun.

However, Liu Yu was not without controveries. In 309, (Note: Emperor Hui had died in January 307.) Sima Yue was worried of Emperor Huai of Jin, who he suspected had built an inner circle of advisors for himself to counter the prince's growing influence. Sima Yue consulted with Liu Yu regarding the matter, and Liu Yu advised that he work with Pan Tao to have those involved such as Mou Bo (繆播) and Wang Yan (王延) all executed. The prince agreed, and after fabricating charges of treason, he had all of Emperor Huai's confidants killed. Wang Yan had a favourite consort, Lady Jing (荊氏), who was talented in music. Before Wang was even buried, Liu Yu claimed her as his own concubine but was unable to marry her as she was taken by another official, Wang Jun (王俊). The Assistant to the Imperial Counsellor had Liu Yu impeached, but Sima Yue did not investigate his crime and had Wang Jun dismissed from his post instead.

In 311, before the fall of Luoyang in the Disaster of Yongjia, Liu Yu died of carbuncle at the age of 47. He was posthumously awarded the office of General of Agile Cavalry and given the posthumous name of Zhen. His son, Liu Yan succeeded him and became an important general for Liu Kun in his war against Han-Zhao.
