= Liu Qiao (Jin dynasty) =

Western Jin dynasty general (249–311)

- 劉喬

Inspector of Yuzhou (豫州刺史)
- In office 303–305
- Monarch: Emperor Hui of Jin

Personal details
- Born: 249 Dengzhou, Henan
- Died: 5 May 311 Zhoukou, Henan
- Children: Liu You; Liu Ting
- Parent: Liu Fu (father)
- Courtesy name: Zhongyan (仲彥)
- Peerage: Marquis of Yangzhong; Baron of Anzhong

Liu Qiao (249 – 5 May 311), courtesy name Zhongyan, was a military general of the Jin dynasty (266–420). He participated in the conquest of Wu and the subjugation of Zhang Chang's rebellion, and was active during the War of the Eight Princes. In 305, he sided with the Prince of Hejian, Sima Yong, against the Prince of Donghai, Sima Yue and was a central figure in their conflict. His defeat allowed Sima Yue to overcome Sima Yong and win the civil war, but Yue pardoned him and appointed him as part of the new regime. He was captured and executed by the Han-Zhao general, Shi Le following the Battle of Ningping in 311.

== Early life and career ==
Liu Qiao was a native of Anzhong County (安眾縣; in present-day Dengzhou, Henan) in Nanyang Commandery. His family claimed descent from Marquis Kang of Anzhong, Liu Dan (劉丹) from the Western Han dynasty. Liu Dan was the son of a concubine of Prince Ding of Changsha, Liu Fa (劉発), (Note: Liu Fa was also an ancestor of Emperor Guangwu of Han, founder of the Eastern Han.) who in turn was the sixth son of Emperor Jing of Han. Liu Qiao's grandfather Liu Yi (劉廙; 180 - 221) and father Liu Fu (劉阜) were both officials of the Cao Wei dynasty. Liu Yi was initially Liu Fu's uncle, but after Yi died without issue, Fu was made Yi's heir by Cao Pi. When Liu Qiao was young, he served as a Gentleman Cadet of the Imperial Library before becoming an Army Advisor to the General Who Establishes Might, Wang Rong.

In 279, Emperor Wu of Jin launched a conquest of Jin's rival state, Eastern Wu, which Wang Rong took part in. Wang Rong ordered Liu Qiao and another Army Advisor, Luo Shang, to cross the Yangzi River and capture the key city of Wuchang (武昌; present-day Ezhou, Hubei). The two were successful at their task, and after Jin conquered Wu in 280, Liu Qiao was appointed Prefect of Xingyang. He was later promoted to Equestrian Forerunner to the Crown Prince.

== War of the Eight Princes ==
=== Empress Jia and Sima Lun's coups ===
In April 291, Empress Jia, wife and regent of the developmentally disabled Emperor Hui of Jin, launched a coup against her co-regent, Yang Jun. Liu Qiao sided with and helped the empress, and after Yang Jun's death, he was awarded the title of Marquis of Yangzhong and appointed as assistant director of the Right in the Department of State Affairs. However, in May 300, when the Prince of Zhao, Sima Lun carried out his coup against Empress Jia and her family, Liu Qiao sided with Sima Lun. For his contributions, he was given the title of Baron of Anzhong and made Cavalier Attendant-in-Ordinary.

=== Service under Sima Jiong ===
In 301, Liu Qiao began serving the Prince of Qi, Sima Jiong after the latter overthrew Sima Lun and took control of the government. Sima Jiong was friends with the minister, Ji Shao (son of Ji Kang), who he gave special treatment by always climbing downstairs just to welcome him. Liu Qiao disapproved of this habit, and he told Sima Jiong, "When Pei Wei and Zhang Hua were killed, all the officials were afraid of Sun Xiu and dared not accept their (Pei Wei and Zhang Hua) properties. So, what fear does Ji Shao have now to stop him from hoarding the Pei family's ox carts and the Zhang family's servants? Even when Yue Guang visits you, you would not leave your bed to greet him, so why show this respect to Ji Shao?" Sima Jiong agreed and stopped. Later, Ji Shao said to Liu Qiao, "Why does the Grand General (Sima Jiong) not greet me as he used to?" to which Liu Qiao replied, "Perhaps there was an upright individual who said that you were not worthy of such welcome." When Ji Shao asked who it was, Liu Qiao only said, "He's not too far away."

Sima Jiong had another trusted confidant named Dong Ai (董艾), who held a significant amount of power in the imperial court. Many officials were afraid to speak out against him except for Liu Qiao. In the span of twenty days, Liu Qiao attempted to remove him from office on six separate occasions for his wrongdoings. Annoyed by Liu Qiao's opposition, Dong Ai asked the assistant director of the Right in the Department of State Affairs, Gou Xi, to remove him from his post. Thus, Liu Qiao was demoted to Colonel of the Garrison Cavalry.

=== Zhang Chang's Rebellion ===
In 303, the Man rebel, Zhang Chang, led a rebellion against Jin in Jiangxia Commandery. The court made Liu Qiao the Inspector of Yuzhou and sent him with the Inspector of Jingzhou, Liu Hong to quell the rebellion. Liu Qiao camped in Runan Commandery, and when Zhang Chang sent his general Huang Lin (黃林) with 20,000 soldiers to invade Yuzhou, Liu Qiao repelled him. As Zhang Chang was quickly gaining territory, Liu Hong sent his army to fight him in Jingling while Liu Qiao sent his general, Li Yang (李楊), to capture his capital in Jiangxia. Zhang Chang was decisively defeated in Jingling, and by early 304, his rebellion had ended. Due to his merits, Liu Qiao was made General of the Left.

=== Alliance with Sima Yong ===
In 304, Zhang Fang, a general of the Prince of Hejian, Sima Yong, forcibly moved Emperor Hui from Luoyang to Chang’an. In response, Liu Qiao raised troops to return the emperor to Luoyang. In 305, the anti-Sima Yong coalition acclaimed the Prince of Donghai, Sima Yue, as their leader. After becoming leader, Sima Yue assigned some of his allies to new positions without the emperor's consent. Liu Qiao was transferred to General Who Stabilizes the North and Inspector of Jizhou, while his old position of Inspector of Yuzhou was given to the Prince of Fanyang, Sima Xiao. Meanwhile, the two brothers, Liu Kun and Liu Yu, and their father Liu Fan (劉蕃) were given new and higher offices by Sima Yue and Sima Xiao.

Liu Qiao felt that Sima Yue was acting beyond his discretion and abusing his power. Therefore, he turned on the coalition and sent a letter to Sima Yong's court, denouncing Liu Kun and Liu Yu for their crimes and stating his intention to attack Sima Xiao's base in Xuchang. He also sent his eldest son, Liu You (劉祐), to block Sima Yue's army at the Ling Ramparts (靈壁) in Xiao County. The Prince of Dongping, Sima Mao (司馬楙), another member of the coalition, also defected to Sima Yong's side and joined forces with Liu Qiao.

When Liu Qiao's letter reached Sima Yong, an edict was issued ordering the generals, Liu Hong and Liu Zhun, and the Prince of Pengcheng, Sima Shi (司馬釋) to assist Liu Qiao against the coalition. Sima Yong also ordered his generals Zhang Fang and Lü Lang (呂朗) to march towards Xuchang while the Prince of Chengdu, Sima Ying and Shi Chao camped at Heqiao (河穚; southwest of present-day Mengzhou, Henan) to act as reserves for Liu Qiao. Liu Qiao was promoted to General Who Guards The East and Credential Holder, but although Sima Yong was heavily relying on him to win the war, the prince refused to listen to any of his suggestions. Meanwhile, Liu Hong tried to persuade Liu Qiao and Sima Yue to sue for peace, but both parties ignored his request.

As Xuchang was very lightly defended, Liu Qiao easily took the city and forced Liu Kun, Liu Yu and Sima Xiao to flee north. In the process, he captured Liu Fan and his wife and forced them into a prison cart. Despite taking Xuchang, Sima Yong's forces were also experiencing issues as Zhang Fang refused to move his army and Liu Hong secretly defected to Sima Yue.

Not long after Xuchang fell, Sima Xiao was able to get the Inspector of Jizhou, Wen Xian (溫羨), to relinquish the office to him. The Inspector of Youzhou, Wang Jun, supported Xiao by providing him with Xianbei and Wuhuan "charging cavalry". Liu Kun and Sima Xiao crossed the Yellow River to attack Xingyang, where they killed Shi Chao and forced Liu Qiao to retreat to Kaocheng (考城, in modern Shangqiu, Henan). Sima Xiao then routed Sima Mao while Liu Kun recaptured Xuchang with little resistance. Finally, Liu Kun linked up with Sima Yue, and at Qiao Commandery, they defeated and killed Liu You. The defeats in quick succession caused Liu Qiao's soldiers to scatter, and he was forced to flee to Pingshi County (平氏; in present-day Nanyang, Henan) with only 500 riders.

Liu Qiao's defeat caused Sima Yong to panic and allowed Sima Yue to march west into the Guanzhong region. In 306, Sima Yue's forces captured Chang'an and retrieved Emperor Hui. Despite Liu Qiao's betrayal, Yue included him in a general amnesty and assigned him as Libationer-Advisor of the Army to the Grand Tutor.

== Later life and death ==
Liu Qiao continued to serve in the Jin administration up to his death. At the time, Jin was in a period of crisis as the Han-Zhao dynasty sought control over northern China. In 310, Liu Qiao followed Sima Yue when he left Luoyang with his army to Xiang County (項縣; in present-day Shenqiu County, Henan). After Sima Yue died in April 311, Liu Qiao was subsequently made Inspector of Yuzhou, Chief Controller of Yuzhou and General Who Guards the East. Without a leader, Sima Yue's officials agreed to go to his fief to carry out his funeral first. However, the Han general, Shi Le, intercepted them at Ningping City and dealt them a disastrous defeat. Liu Qiao was captured and executed by being crushed by a wall alongside many other officials.

During the end of the Jianxing era (313–317), Emperor Min of Jin posthumously appointed him as Minister of Works. He was succeeded by at least one son named Liu Ting (劉挺), and his descendants can be traced all the way to the Tang dynasty. (Note: Jin historian Sun Sheng wrote in his Jin Yang Qiu that Liu Qiao's descendants had great social and political status all the way until his time. Sun was about nine years old when Liu Qiao died.) Among his descendants were Empress Liu of the Huan Chu dynasty (Liu Ting's granddaughter) and the Tang chancellor, Liu Ji.
