= Yang Jun =

Yang Jun is the name of several people:

== Sports ==
- Yang Jun (martial artist) (born 1968), tai chi master and teacher
- Yang Jun (footballer) (born 1981), Chinese footballer
- Yang Jun (water polo) (born 1988), Chinese female water polo player

== Others ==
- Yang Jun (minister) (died 291), minister of Jin dynasty
- Yang Jun (prince) (571–600), prince of Sui dynasty
- Jun Yang (artist) (born 1975), Chinese-Austrian contemporary artist
- Yang Hengjun (born 1965), Chinese-Australian writer and businessman
