= Liu Yan (Jin dynasty) =

Military general of the Jin dynasty

- 劉演

Inspector of Yan province (兗州刺史)
- In office 313 – 316
- Monarch: Emperor Huai of Jin

Personal details
- Born: Unknown
- Died: Before 321 Dezhou, Shandong
- Relations: Liu Kun (uncle)
- Parent: Liu Yu
- Courtesy name: Shiren (始仁)
- Peerage: Marquis of Dingxiang (定襄侯)

Liu Yan (fl.300–316), courtesy name Shiren, was a military general of the Jin dynasty (266–420). He was the eldest son of Liu Yu and the nephew of the Inspector of Bing province, Liu Kun. During the final years of the Western Jin, he held the position of Inspector of Yan province and assisted his uncle against the Han-Zhao dynasty.

== Life ==
Liu Yan was the eldest son of the famous official, Liu Yu, who was an influential advisor to the regent and Prince of Donghai, Sima Yue. He initially served as a Senior Clerk to the Grand Commandant before he was transferred to the position of Gentleman of Writing. His father died some time around 311, after which he resigned to carry out his mourning period. When he returned to the government, he inherited his father's title of Marquis of Dingxiang and was invited by Sima Yue to serve as his Registrar. Liu Yan was later moved to Zhongshuzi to the Crown Prince and then sent out of Luoyang to serve as Administrator of Yangping Commandery.

Not long after taking up his new position, Luoyang fell to the Han-Zhao dynasty during the Disaster of Yongjia in 311. At the time, his uncle, Liu Kun was serving as the Inspector of Bing province and continued to resist the growing Han threat from Jinyang. In 312, the Han generals Zhao Gu and Wang Sang (王桑) were ravaging the counties of Hebei Commandery (河北; in present-day Yuncheng, Shanxi), so Liu Kun appointed Liu Yan as General Who Assists the State and Administrator of Wei Commandery to defend the important city of Ye. Zhao Gu and Wang Sang feared retaliation from Liu Yan, so they sent the Chief Clerk, Lin Shen (臨深) as a hostage to Liu Kun.

Liu Yan was further appointed as General of the Household Gentlemen of the North. Not long after, Zhao Gu and Wang Sang planned on surrendering back to Han, but Lin Shen and another general, Mou Mu (牟穆) refused, bringing with them 10,000 to properly submit to Liu Yan. Wang Sang then decided against his original intent and tried to flee east to Qing province instead. Zhao Gu attacked Wang Sang, and Liu Yan took advantage of their infighting to strike at them. Wang Sang was killed in battle while Zhao Gu retreated. Wang's general, Zhang Feng also surrendered to Liu Yan with 7,000 of his remaining troops.

Later in the year, the Han commander, Shi Le carried out a surprise attack on Ye. Liu Yan stood his ground, but Lin Shen and Mou Mu surrendered tens of thousands of troops to Shi Le. However, Shi Le observed that Ye was still well-fortified, so he abandoned the assault and moved to Xiangguo, where he established his base while he waited for Liu Yan's forces to collapse on their own.

In 313, Shi Le sent his general, Shi Hu to attack the Three Terraces of Ye again, and this time, Liu Yan was unable to resist. His generals, Xie Xu (謝胥), Tian Qing (田青) and Lang Mu (郎牧) all surrendered to Shi Hu, taking the refugees in Ye with them. Liu Yan was able to escape, and Liu Kun appointed his nephew as the Inspector of Yan province. He then lead 1,000 of his best soldiers to reestablish his base at Linqiu (廩丘, in modern Puyang, Henan). When the Intendant of Henan, Wei Jun was besieged at Fort Shiliang (石梁塢; in present-day Mengjin County, Henan) by the Han general, Liu Yao, Liu Yan and the Administrator of Henei, Guo Mo led reinforcements to relieve him, but suffered a heavy defeat at Hebei. Wei Jun escaped during the night, but was pursued and killed by Liu Yao's army.

In 315, another subordinate of Shi Le, Zhi Xiong attacked Linqiu, but Liu Yan defeated him. Liu Yan then ordered Han Hong (韓弘) and Pan Liang (潘良) to invade Dunqiu (頓丘; near present-day Qingfeng County, Henan), where they killed Shi Le's administrator, Shao Pan (邵攀). However, Han Hong and the others were counterattacked by Zhi Xiong, and Pan Liang was killed. Later, the Prince of Langya, Sima Rui at Jiankang appointed Liu Yan as Chief Controller and General of the Rear.

In 316, Linqiu came under attack from Shi Hu, and Liu Yan requested reinforcements from the Inspector of Ji province, Shao Xu, who was defending Yanci (厭次, around present-day Dezhou, Shandong). Shao Xu sent Duan Wenyang of the Duan tribe to rescue him, but Shi Hu fortified Luguan Crossing (盧關津; south of present-day Fan County, Henan), preventing Duan from advancing further. At the time, Zhang Ping (張平) and several local leaders in Yu province raised their armies to aid Liu Yan. Liu appointed Zhang Ping as Inspector of Yu province and another leader, Fan Ya (樊雅) as Administrator of Qiao princely fief. However, Shi Hu ambushed and routed their forces.

Without any support Liu Yan could no longer defend Linqiu and abandoned the city, fleeing to Duan Wenyang's army. His younger brother, Liu Qi (劉啓), was captured and sent to Xiangguo. Liu Yan followed Duan Wenyang and was stationed at Yanci, where he was eventually killed likely before or around the time the city fell to the Later Zhao in 321.
