= Sima Jun (prince) =

Western Jin Prince Wu of Fufeng (232-286)

Sima Jun 司馬骏

Prince of Fufeng (扶风王)
- Reign: 5 October 277 – 2 November 286
- Successor: Sima Chang (Note: On 22 December 289, Sima Chang's fiefdom was changed to Shunyang.)

Prince of Ruyin (汝阴王)
- Reign: 9 February 266 – 5 October 277
- Born: 232 (Note: Sima Jun was eight (by East Asian reckoning) when Cao Fang became emperor in Jan 239.)
- Died: November 2, 286 (aged 53–54); Luoyang, Henan
- Consort: Lady Zang (mother of Sima Xin)
- Issue: 10 sons, including Sima Chang (司馬畅) and Sima Xin (司馬歆; d. June 303)
Names
- Family name: Sima (司馬); Given name: Jun (骏); Courtesy name: Zizang (子臧)
Posthumous name
- Wu (武)
- House: House of Sima
- Father: Sima Yi
- Mother: Lady Fu

Sima Jun (simplified Chinese: 司马骏; traditional Chinese: 司馬駿; (Note: not to be confused with his great-grandfather with a similar-sounding name; see Sima Fang for more details.) 232 – 2 November 286), courtesy name Zizang (子臧), posthumously known as Prince Wu of Fufeng (扶风武王), was the youngest son of Sima Yi and his concubine Lady Fu, and a younger half-brother of Sima Shi and Sima Zhao. Sima Yi, Sima Shi and Sima Zhao eventually became regents of the Cao Wei state during the Three Kingdoms era. Besides his heritage, Sima Jun was best known for his involvement in the pacification of Tufa Shujineng's Rebellion during the reign of his nephew, Emperor Wu of Jin.

== Life under Cao Wei ==
Sima Jun was born in 232 during the reign of Cao Rui, as the youngest son of Sima Yi and his concubine Lady Fu; his elder full brothers were Sima Liang, Sima Zhou and Sima Jing (司馬京). (Note: Of Sima Yi's sons, only Sima Shi (first), Sima Liang (fourth) and Sima Lun (ninth) had their birth orders explicitly recorded in Book of Jin. Sima Zhao's biography in the same work also recorded that he was a younger full-brother of Sima Shi. The age order between Sima Gan and Sima Jun is unknown; Gan was also born in 232 as he was 80 (by East Asian reckoning) when he died in Feb 311. Yu Yu's Jin Shu, cited in vol. 01 of Shishuo Xinyu, recorded that Jun was Yi's 17th son.) A precocious child, Sima Jun could write court submissions and quote the classics fluently when he was four or five years old, surprising those who witnessed such acts. When he was a bit older, he also had philosophical debates with Xun Yi on the Confucian values ren and xiao.

In February 249, when Sima Jun was about 17 years old, his father, uncle, and eldest half-brother took part in a coup against the Cao Wei regent Cao Shuang; the success of the coup meant that from then on, the Sima clan was in control over Cao Wei, and this control increased further during Sima Shi's and Sima Zhao's tenures as regent.

== Life during the Jin era ==
In February 266, Sima Zhao's son Sima Yan accepted Cao Huan's abdication and founded the Jin dynasty. Sima Jun was then made Prince of Ruyin on 9 February, with a fiefdom of 10000 households.

In December 268 or January 269, Eastern Wu forces led by Ding Feng and Zhuge Jing attacked Hefei. As General Who Pacifies the East, (Note: This post is of significance to the Sima clan as Sima Zhao himself had held the post (per vol.76 of Zizhi Tongjian).) Sima Jun was able to fend them off.

On 27 August 270, Sima Jun was appointed Grand General Who Guards The West and Chief Controller of Yong, Liang and the other western provinces, and he was tasked in protecting Guanzhong, replacing his elder brother Sima Liang.

After the initial failed attempts of the Jin court at quelling Tufa Shujineng's rebellion, Sima Jun focused his soldiers on agriculture in Guanzhong. In September or October 274, rebels from Liang attacked Jincheng again, but Sima Jun defeated them and killed one of their leaders, Qiwenni (乞文泥). In 275, he campaigned against Shujineng and defeated his forces, killing 3,000 rebels.

Later that year, when Sima Jun was ordered to lead 7,000 soldiers to strengthen the garrison in Liang, Shujineng, Houdanbo (侯彈勃) and their followers planned to raid the military-agricultural colonies in Guanzhong in his absence. However, his subordinate, Wen Yang, led a combined force from Liang, Qin and Yong to threaten the rebels. Shujineng sent Houdanbo and twenty tribesmen to submit to Jin, each sending their sons as hostages. Wen Yang also received the surrender of 200,000 tribal people from Anding, Beidi and Jincheng including the chieftains Jikeluo (吉軻羅), Houjinduo (侯金多) and Rejiong (熱冏). In c.June 276, Sima Jun campaigned against the northern "Hu" (北胡) and killed one of their leaders, Tudun (吐敦). About six months later, (Note: The 2nd year of the Xian'ning era had a leap 9th month.) in c.December, Sima Jun was promoted to Senior General Who Attacks the West.

== Death and aftermath ==
In January 283, (Note: Emperor Wu's biography in Book of Jin recorded that Sima You was made da sima, Great General who Stabilizes the East, and chief controller of Qingzhou on 28 January 283. This was also the last entry to mention You before his death in April that year.) Sima You was ordered by Emperor Wu to leave Luoyang for his fiefdom of Qi. Sima Jun petitioned earnestly for Emperor Wu to rescind his order, but Emperor Wu refused. Sima Jun then fell ill, and after a long illness, he died in November 286. After news of his death reached the western regions of the Jin empire, mourners filled the streets, and the locals erected steles for Sima Jun. Elders who saw the steles knelt to pay their respects. His son, Sima Chang (司馬暢; fl.270 - July 311) inherited his princely title; on 22 December 289, he was appointed Prince of Shunyang, while his younger brother Sima Xin was made Duke of Xinye. Sima Chang would later go missing during the Disaster of Yongjia; there were no further records of his activities or whereabouts.
