= Sima Lue =

Sima Lüe 司馬略

Prince of Gaomi (高密王)
- Tenure: 17 July 299 – 5 April 309
- Born: Unknown
- Died: 5 April 309
- House: Jin dynasty
- Father: Sima Tai

Sima Lüe (司馬略; died 5 April 309), courtesy name Yuanjian (元简), posthumously known as Prince Xiao of Gaomi, was a Western Jin imperial prince. He was a younger brother of Sima Yue, Prince Xiaoxian of Donghai, a regent for Emperor Hui and Emperor Huai, and Sima Teng, as well as an elder brother of Sima Mo.

== Background and early life ==
Sima Lüe was the third son of Sima Tai (司馬泰; posthumously known as Prince Wenxian of Gaomi (高密文献王)), who was a son of Sima Yi's brother Sima Kui (司馬馗), making Lüe a second cousin of Jin's founding emperor Emperor Wu. Despite their distant relationship to the emperor's family, Lüe and his brothers, Sima Yue, Sima Teng and Sima Mo were all renowned members of the imperial clan.

When he was young, Sima Lüe was noted to be filial and respectful, even to his lessers; he was also noted as having his father's mannerisms. When Sima Yu was crown prince, sons of officials who had good reputations were selected to keep him company; Sima Lüe and Hua Heng (a great-grandson of Hua Xin), among others, were selected. When his father Sima Tai died on 17 July 299, during the reign of Emperor Hui, he inherited the title of Prince of Gaomi, as his elder brother Sima Teng was made heir to an unnamed elder of the Sima clan. He served as Regular Mounted Gentleman of the Yellow Gate, Regular Mounted Attendant and Director of the Palace Library. Afterwards, he left Luoyang to serve as General Who Pacifies the South and Chief Controller of military affairs in Miannan (沔南; in present-day Honghu, Hubei).

== Administration of Qing province ==
Sima Lüe was eventually transferred to the office of General Who Pacifies the North and Chief Controller of Qing province. During this period, Sima Lüe drove out the Inspector of Qing province, Cheng Mu (程牧), and claimed the title for himself. When his eldest brother Sima Yue became active in the War of the Eight Princes, Sima Lüe and his brothers took their brother's side. On 4 February 305, as part of the Prince of Hejian, Sima Yong's plan to reconcile with Sima Yue and end the civil war, he appointed Sima Lüe as General Who Guards the South and assigned him to guard Luoyang, although records indicate that Lüe never left his post for the capital.

In 306, the Prefect of Jian County, Liu Bogen (劉伯根), became a bandit and rose an army in rebellion. He was able to entice the people into joining him and his numbers grew more than ten thousand. As Bogen led his followers towards his base in Linzi, Sima Lüe sent his general, Liu Tun (son of Jin official Liu Yi) to intercept them. However, Liu Tun was defeated and fled to Luoyang. Lüe was unable to hold Linzi, so he retreated to defend Liaocheng. The rebellion was soon quelled by the Chief Controller of You province, Wang Jun.

On 18 May 307, during the reign of Emperor Huai of Jin, to better secure his grip over the empire, Sima Yue appointed Sima Lüe as the General who Attacks the South, Chief Controller of Jing Province and was garrisoned at Xiangyang, taking over the guarding of the province from the Inspector of Jing province, Liu Hong, who died the previous year.

== Administration of Jing province ==
In 308, a refugee from Jingzhao Commandery, Wang You (王逌) colluded with Hao Luo (郝洛) of the Sou people (叟人) to gather thousands of people to rebel at Guanjun County (冠軍; northwest of present-day Dengzhou, Henan). Sima Lüe sent his general, Cui Kuang (崔曠) to lead Pi Chu (皮初) and Zhang Luo (張洛) to campaign against them, but they were tricked by Wang You and defeated. Sima Lüe then ordered Cao Shu (great-grandson of Cao Xiu and grandson of Cao Zhao) to lead Cui Kuang against Wang You. During the battle, Cui Kuang, who commanded the rear, secretly retreated and left Cao Shu to fend for himself. Without reserves, Cao Shu was defeated and killed in battle, but Lüe decided to pardon Cui Kuang for his crime. Lüe then sent Han Song to lead Cui Kuang in attacking the rebels, and this time, Wang You surrendered.

Soon after, Sima Lüe was granted privilege to appoint his own advisors and appointed Regular Mounted Attendant. Under his administration, bandits were rampant in Jing province, so much so that the imperial court had to appoint Liu Fan (劉璠), the son of Liu Hong, as the Interior Minister of Shunyang (順陽; south of present-day Xichuan County, Henan), since his father was well-beloved in the region. Many people living between the Han and Yangzi river went to live under Liu Fan.

Sima Lüe died in April 309; his son Sima Ju (司馬據) inherited the title of Prince of Gaomi. He was posthumously appointed as Palace Attendant and Grand Commandant. He was also given the posthumous name of "Xiao" (孝).
