= Xiao County =

Xiaoxian 萧县
- County
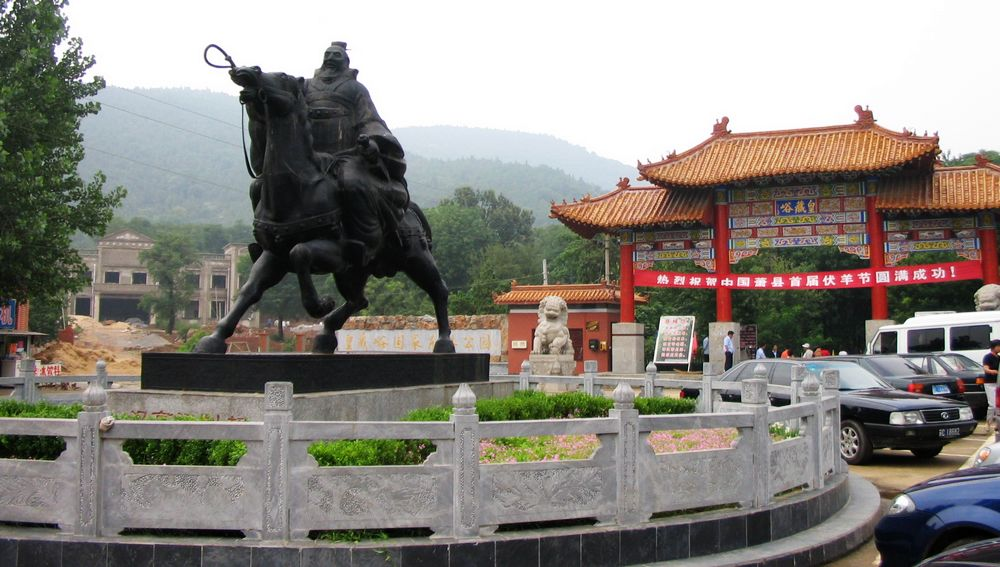
- Interactive map of Xiaoxian
- Coordinates: 34°13′23″N 116°47′32″E
- Country: People's Republic of China
- Province: Anhui
- Prefecture-level city: Suzhou

Government

Area
  - Total: 1,885.3 km^{2} (727.9 sq mi)

Population (2019)
  - Total: 1,202,000
- Time zone: UTC+8 (China Standard)
- Postal code: 235200

Xiao County or Xiaoxian (simplified Chinese: 萧县; traditional Chinese: 蕭縣; pinyin: Xiāo Xiàn) is a county in the north of Anhui Province, China, bordering the provinces of Jiangsu to the north and northeast and Henan to the west. It is under the administration of the prefecture-level city of Suzhou. It was formerly part of Jiangsu province, under the administration of Xuzhou. It became part of Anhui province in 1950.

== Administrative divisions ==
In the present, Xiao County has 18 towns and 5 townships.

18 Towns

- Longcheng (龙城镇)
- Huangkou (黄口镇)
- Dingli (丁里镇)
- Xinzhuang (新庄镇)
- Qinglong (青龙镇)
- Majing (马井镇)
- Baitu (白土镇)
- Datun (大屯镇)
- Dulou (杜楼镇)
- Guanqiao (官桥镇)
- Yanglou (杨楼镇)
- Liutao (刘套镇)
- Wangzhai (王寨镇)
- Yanji (闫集镇)
- Yonggu (永固镇)
- Zhangzhuangzhai (张庄寨镇)
- Zhaozhuang (赵庄镇)
- Zulou (祖楼镇)

5 Townships

- Shilin (石林乡)
- Shengquan (圣泉乡)
- Jiudian (酒店乡)
- Zhuangli (庄里乡)
- Sunweizi (孙圩孜乡)

== Climate ==
Climate data for Xiaoxian, elevation 35 m (115 ft), (1991–2020 normals, extremes 1981–present)
Month	Jan	Feb	Mar	Apr	May	Jun	Jul	Aug	Sep	Oct	Nov	Dec	Year
Record high °C (°F)	17.6 (63.7)	26.0 (78.8)	31.6 (88.9)	31.9 (89.4)	38.0 (100.4)	39.4 (102.9)	40.5 (104.9)	38.1 (100.6)	36.6 (97.9)	34.6 (94.3)	27.5 (81.5)	21.4 (70.5)	40.5 (104.9)
Mean daily maximum °C (°F)	5.8 (42.4)	9.3 (48.7)	14.8 (58.6)	21.3 (70.3)	26.6 (79.9)	31.0 (87.8)	31.8 (89.2)	30.8 (87.4)	27.3 (81.1)	22.1 (71.8)	14.6 (58.3)	7.9 (46.2)	20.3 (68.5)
Daily mean °C (°F)	0.6 (33.1)	3.7 (38.7)	9.0 (48.2)	15.3 (59.5)	20.7 (69.3)	25.3 (77.5)	27.4 (81.3)	26.3 (79.3)	21.9 (71.4)	16.0 (60.8)	8.7 (47.7)	2.5 (36.5)	14.8 (58.6)
Mean daily minimum °C (°F)	−3.3 (26.1)	−0.7 (30.7)	3.8 (38.8)	9.5 (49.1)	15.1 (59.2)	20.2 (68.4)	23.7 (74.7)	22.9 (73.2)	17.6 (63.7)	11.1 (52.0)	4.1 (39.4)	−1.6 (29.1)	10.2 (50.4)
Record low °C (°F)	−13.7 (7.3)	−17.5 (0.5)	−8.8 (16.2)	−1.9 (28.6)	3.1 (37.6)	11.6 (52.9)	16.3 (61.3)	13.7 (56.7)	5.9 (42.6)	−1.7 (28.9)	−8.6 (16.5)	−15.9 (3.4)	−17.5 (0.5)
Average precipitation mm (inches)	17.2 (0.68)	20.9 (0.82)	33.0 (1.30)	40.1 (1.58)	67.2 (2.65)	112.8 (4.44)	233.0 (9.17)	158.5 (6.24)	66.3 (2.61)	38.9 (1.53)	34.7 (1.37)	17.6 (0.69)	840.2 (33.08)
Average precipitation days (≥ 0.1 mm)	4.3	5.1	6.0	7.0	7.2	7.6	13.0	11.3	8.1	5.8	6.0	4.3	85.7
Average snowy days	3.3	2.5	0.9	0	0	0	0	0	0	0	0.7	1.6	9
Average relative humidity (%)	69	67	65	67	69	69	81	83	79	73	73	70	72
Mean monthly sunshine hours	137.0	141.9	184.0	209.2	219.4	205.8	197.2	188.8	178.9	176.6	151.8	145.0	2,135.6
Percentage possible sunshine	43	46	49	53	51	48	45	46	49	51	49	47	48
Source: China Meteorological Administration
