= Sima Teng =

Prince Wu'ai of Xincai (died 307)

Sima Teng 司馬腾

Prince of Xincai (新蔡王)
- Tenure: 18 May 307 – June or July 307
- Successor: Sima Yue

Prince of Dongyan (东燕王)
- Tenure: c.November 306 – 18 May 307
- Born: Unknown
- Died: June or July 307
- Issue: Sima Que
- House: Jin dynasty
- Father: Sima Tai

Sima Teng (司馬腾) (died June or July 307), courtesy name Yuanmai (元迈), posthumously known as Prince Wu'ai of Xincai, was a Western Jin imperial prince. He was a younger brother of Sima Yue, Prince Xiaoxian of Donghai, a regent for Emperor Hui and Emperor Huai, and the elder brother of Sima Lue and Sima Mo.

== Background ==
Sima Teng was the second son of Sima Tai (司馬泰; posthumously known as Prince Wenxian of Gaomi (高密文献王)), who was a son of Sima Yi's brother Sima Kui (司馬馗), making Teng a second cousin of Jin's founding emperor Emperor Wu. Sima Teng's first title was Duke of Dongying. When his father Sima Tai died on 17 July 299, during the reign of Emperor Hui, his younger brother Sima Lüe inherited the title of Prince of Gaomi, as Sima Teng was made heir to an unnamed elder of the Sima clan. Despite their distant relationship to the emperor's family, Teng and his brothers, Sima Yue, Sima Lue and Sima Mo were all renowned members of the imperial clan.

When he was young, Sima Teng was appointed as director of imperial attendants before serving as an administrator at Nanyang and Wei commanderies. He was praised for his works wherever he went, and when he was summoned to the capital, Luoyang, he was served as the minister of the Imperial Clan and then as the minister of ceremonies. In around 300, he was promoted to General Who Tranquilizes the North, Chief Controller of Bing province and Inspector of Bing province.

== Administration of Bing province ==
=== Famine in Bing and slave trade ===
At the time, Bing province was home to the Five Divisions (五部) and various non-Chinese or hu tribes, most of who were descendants of the Southern Xiongnu that once lived in there. In 303, a great famine struck Bing, displacing many of the tribespeople. A general of Sima Teng, Yan Cui (閻粹), advised him to round these people up and sell them into slavery so that they could raise funds to sustain their military. Teng had cangues placed on the captured hu, each shackling two people at once, and sold many of them to the east in Hebei and Shandong. One of these slaves was later known as Shi Le, a chieftain of Jie ethnicity.

=== Sack of Ye ===
In 304, Sima Teng's brother, Sima Yue, set out from Luoyang to attack the Prince of Chengdu, Sima Ying at his base in Ye, but was defeated at the Battle of Dangyin, forcing him to flee to his fief in Donghai. Ying then turned his attention to the Chief Controller of You province, Wang Jun, who he had a grudge with. He plotted to have Wang Jun assassinated, but the plan was foiled and uncovered. Wang Jun invited Sima Teng to form an alliance, and the two men attacked and killed Sima Ying's general, He Yan (和演). Sima Teng and Wang Jun, along with the Duan-Xianbei and Wuhuan chieftain, Jiezhu (羯朱) then led their soldiers towards Ye.

Sima Teng's forces defeated Wang Cui (王粹; grandson of Wang Shizhi), and they later acted as reserves for Wang Jun when he led the Xianbei to defeat Wang Bin (王斌). Sima Ying could no longer resist them and fled, allowing Wang Jun's soldiers to enter and sack Ye.

=== War with Han-Zhao and alliance with the Tuoba ===
While Sima Teng was out campaigning, one of Sima Ying's generals, Liu Yuan had left Ye to travel to Bing and rally the Five Divisions. Liu Yuan was a noble from the Five Divisions and an alleged descendant of the Southern Xiongnu chanyus. Though he told the prince his intention of bringing reinforcements against Wang Jun and Sima Teng, in reality, the Five Divisions had been planning to rebel, and once Liu Yuan arrived at Lishi, he was acclaimed as the Grand Chanyu. Sima Teng requested assistance from the Tuoba-Xianbei people living north of Bing province. The three head chiefs of the Tuoba, Tuoba Yituo, Tuoba Yilu and Tuoba Luguan, all joined forces to attack Liu Yuan at Xihe Commandery, routing him. This event marked the first time the Tuoba became involved in the war in Bing.

Later in 304, Liu Yuan declared himself the King of Han (renamed Zhao in 319), claiming descent from the Han dynasty and intending to restore their rule. Sima Teng sent his general, Nie Xuan (聶玄) to attack Liu Yuan, but he was badly defeated at Daling (大陵; northeast of present-day Wenshui County, Shanxi). Teng was frightened by the defeat that he had more than 20,000 households in Bing moved to the south, allowing the Han general, Liu Yao to capture Xuanshi (泫氏; in present-day Gaoping, Shanxi), Tunliu, Zhangzi and Zhongdu (中都; in present-day Pingyao County, Shanxi) counties in Taiyuan Commandery in quick succession. Another Han general, Qiao Xi (喬晞) invaded Xihe and captured Jiexiu county, where he killed the local administrator Jia Hun (賈渾).

In 305, Sima Teng ordered Sima Yu (司馬瑜), Zhou Liang (周良), Shi Xian (石鮮) and others to launch a counterattack against Liu Yuan. Their forces reached Fencheng (汾城; in present-day Xiangfen County, Shanxi) near Liu Yuan's capital, Lishi, where they fought four battles with Han forces and were defeated. Liu Yuan then attacked Sima Teng's base in Jinyang, prompting the prince to once again call for reinforcements from Tuoba Yituo. Yituo led his light cavalry to assist Teng and killed the Han general, Qiwu Tun (綦毋豚).

In c.November 306, after Sima Yue defeated the Prince of Hejian, Sima Yong and brought Emperor Hui of Jin under his control at Luoyang in June, Sima Teng's peerage was promoted to the Prince of Dongyan. Around this time, Sima Teng decided to dismiss his Tuoba allies. Before departing, Tuoba Yituo and Sima Teng made a pact of alliance at Fendong (汾東; in present-day Quwo County, Shanxi).

== As Prince of Xincai ==
=== Founding of the Qihuo ===
On 18 May 307, during the reign of Emperor Huai of Jin, Sima Teng was appointed Prince of Xincai, and was made Chief Controller of Si and Ji Provinces. He was garrisoned at Ye while his old position as Inspector of Bing was taken up by Liu Kun. When Sima Teng left for Ye, many of the generals of Bing such as Tian Zhen (田甄), Li Yun (李惲), Bo Sheng (薄盛) and others led their armies to follow after him to search for food in Ji province as Bing was still suffering from the war and famine. These generals formed a group known as the "Begging-for-life" or Qihuo, who maintained a relatively influential presence among refugee groups throughout the Jin dynasty and Sixteen Kingdoms period.

=== Death ===
During his short time in Ye, Sima Teng was said to have spent lavishly despite the government warehouses being empty. A month after his transfer, a Chinese shepherd, Ji Sang, led a rebel army into Hebei proclaiming his intention to avenge the late Sima Ying, who had been a beloved figure in the region. With the former slave, Shi Le as his second-in-command, they headed straight towards Ye, defeating the Administrator of Wei Commandery, Feng Song (馮嵩) along the way. As Ji Sang was close by, Teng was only willing to spare a few sheng of rice and a few chi of silk to his generals and soldiers, so he was unable to employ them properly. He did not prepare defences and was even recorded to have said, "In my seven years in Bing province, the barbarians would sometimes surround my city but could never take it. This Ji Sang is a mere bandit, so there is no need for worry."

However, when Ji Sang's general, Li Feng (李豐), arrived, Sima Teng was unable to repel him. He attempted to flee on horseback, but was killed by Li Feng. Ji Sang and Shi Le's forces burnt Ye and slaughtered the city's inhabitants, including the prince's three sons, Sima Yu (司馬虞), Sima Jiao (司馬矯) and Sima Shao (司馬紹). As it was the height of summer, the corpses in the city decayed so badly, that when the Jin general, Gou Xi arrived at Ye, the remains of Sima Teng and his sons could not be identified. The Qihuo soon killed Ji Sang in January 308 in an act of vengeance for killing the prince. Teng's fourth son, Sima Que (司馬確), inherited his title of Prince of Xincai in 308, but was later killed by Shi Le in c.March 311.
