= Second encirclement campaign against the Hubei–Henan–Shaanxi Soviet =

1935 military campaign

- Part of the Chinese Civil War
Date	February, 1935 – April 18, 1935
Location	Border region of Hubei, Henan, and Shaanxi provinces, China
Result	Communist victory

Belligerents
National Revolutionary Army	Chinese Red Army

Commanders and leaders
Yang Hucheng	Xu Haidong

Strength
7,500	3,000

Casualties and losses
2,000	Low

The second encirclement campaign against the Hubei–Henan–Shaanxi Soviet was an encirclement campaign launched by the Nationalist Government of China against the Communist Party's Hubei–Henan–Shaanxi Soviet and its local Red Army. The Red Army successfully defended the Soviet from February 1935 to April 18, 1935.

== Order of battle ==
- National Revolutionary Army (Nationalists)
  - 115th Brigade
  - 2nd Garrison Brigade
  - 3rd Garrison Brigade
  - local security forces
- Communists
  - 25th Army of Chinese Red Army

== Background ==
After their defeat in the first encirclement campaign against the Hubei–Henan–Shaanxi Soviet, the Nationalist Government immediately regrouped and launched their second encirclement campaign in the hope of not leaving their communist enemy enough time to rest, regroup and recover.

The Nationalists deployed the veteran unit of the first encirclement campaign, the 2nd Garrison Brigade, as the force to chase the enemy main force. The Nationalist 115th Brigade and Garrison Regiment stationed at Lantian, Shanyang and Shangxian were also mobilized to attack the town of Gepai.

== Engagement ==
The campaign begun in mid-February 1935 with the Nationalist attack on the town of Gepai. The 25th Red Army, no match for their Nationalist adversary which enjoyed both numerical and technical superiorities, decided to withdraw south to Yunxi in the modern-day municipal region of Ankang. While on their retreat, the Communists took the county town of Ningshan and Foping, completely annihilating the defending forces.

On March 8, 1935, Communist forces took Huayang in Yang County. The Nationalist 2nd Garrison Brigade, in close pursuit, reached a point east of Huayang at the same time. Two days later, to the town's southeast, the Communists ambushed the Brigade at Shitasi (石塔寺); five battalions were completely annihilated, over six hundred Nationalist troops were killed, and over five hundred guns were captured. The Nationalist commander Zhang Feisheng (张飞生) was wounded but successfully escaped with his life, but the nationalist 2nd Garrison Brigade was forced out of action as a result of the defeat.

In late March the Communist 25th Army returned to the modern municipal region of Shangluo, camping between Lantian and Gepai towns. Although the Nationalist 3rd Garrison Brigade at Zhashui and Zhen'an county-towns could not stop their communist adversary, it did manage to follow closely. However, on April 9, 1935, the Nationalist 3rd Garrison Brigade was ambushed by the Communists near Jiujianfang, south of Gepai. Two regiments were completely annihilated, more than a thousand Nationalist troops were taken prisoner - including the brigade commander Zhang Hanmin (张汉民). Riding on their victory, the communists took the county town of Luonan on April 18.

== Results ==
With more than three fifths of their deployed force now out of action after continuous defeat, the Government army was forced to call off its second encirclement campaign against the Hubei–Henan–Shaanxi Soviet. Taking advantage of their victory, the Communists further consolidated their position in Luonan and Shanyang counties, and in the towns of Wuxing, Zhenzuo (镇柞) and Yunxi. The Red regular force climbed to 3700 by May, and a 2,000 member strong guerrilla force was established as well. The base area was centered around Gepai and Caojiaping (曹家坪).

Uniquely in the history of 20th-century Chinese encirclement campaigns, this second Nationalist defeat did not result in any further large-scale attacks against its target. Instead, in their next encirclement campaign, the Nationalists took a more prudent method of setting a blockade against the communist base. The reason for the rather conservative approach was because Chiang Kai-shek was worried about something much more serious: the potential link up of Mao Zedong's main force and the local Red force in the communist base. As a result, a majority of the nationalist force deployed in the next campaign was concentrated in the south, acting as a blockade between Mao's force and the local Red force. The weak nationalist blockade on the north would eventually enable the local Reds to escape in the following campaign to join their comrades in the Shaanxi–Gansu Soviet. The Red's temporary survival here meant that the Hubei–Henan–Shaanxi Soviet would have an important role to play in succoring the troops soon coming into Shaanxi from their various Long Marches.

== See also ==
- Outline of the Chinese Civil War
- National Revolutionary Army
- History of the People's Liberation Army
