= Wei Gai =

Jin dynasty general (died 328)

- 魏該

Inspector of Yong province (雍州刺史)
- In office ?–328
- Monarch: Emperor Cheng of Jin

Personal details
- Born: Unknown Changwu County, Shaanxi
- Died: 328 Wuling, Changde, Hunan
- Relations: Wei Jun (kinsman)

Wei Gai (died 328), also known as Wei Hai (魏亥), was a military general of the Jin dynasty (266–420). He was a manor lord (塢主; wùzhǔ) in Henan who fought against the Han-Zhao dynasty. After his defeat, he fled south to join the Eastern Jin where he was appointed as the Inspector of Yong province. He died of illness during the suppression of Su Jun's rebellion.

== Life ==
Wei Gai originated from Yinpan county (陰盤縣; northwest of present-day Changwu County, Shaanxi), Jingzhao Commandery. In 301, when the Prince of Hejian, Sima Yong raised an army to suppress the usurper, Sima Lun, Wei Gai joined his staff as a military commander.

In July 311, when the Han-Zhao dynasty attacked the Jin capital, Luoyang, Wei Gai followed his elder kinsman, Wei Jun to rescue the city and led troops to defend Jinyong city (金墉城; near Luoyang, Henan). As a result, Jinyong was spared from disaster that befell Luoyang, and after the Han forces withdrew, many of the survivors sought refuge with Wei Gai.

That same month, the Administrator of Hongnong Commandery, Du Yin (杜尹) was stationed at Fort Yicheng (一泉塢) on the border of Yiyang (宜陽, in modern Luoyang, Henan), where he was repeatedly attacked by bandits. Du requested help from Wei, who responded by sending his subordinate Ma Zhan (馬瞻) with 300 men. However, seeing that Du Yin's defenses were weak, Ma Zhan instead surprise attacked and killed Du Yin during the night before welcoming Wei Gai. The inhabitants of the fort were terrified and submitted to Wei Gai, who then made the fort his new base. Meanwhile, Wei Jun established his own headquarters at Fort Shiliang (石梁塢; in present-day Mengjin County, Henan).

Not long after, the Grand Commandant, Xun Fan founded a provisional government at Mi County. Wei Jun and Wei Gai both submitted to him, with the latter being appointed General of Military Might. Wei Gai was trusted with leading the troops of Yong and Liang provinces west of the city to subdue the Han Prince of Zhongshan, Liu Yao. He also allied with the Administrator of Xingyang, Li Ju and the Administrator of Henei, Guo Mo to fight in the war against Han.

In 313, Wei Jun was killed in battle by Liu Yao's forces, so Wei Gai inherited his kinsman's power. When Liu Yao attacked Li Ju that same year, Wei Gai brought his troops to repel him. The following year, when Li Ju went to welcome Guo Mo who was under siege by Han forces, Wei Gai sent his troops to assist him. Wei also allied with the Intendant of Henan, Ren Yin (任愔), and in an unknown year, the Prince of Langya, Sima Rui appointed him as Champion General, Administrator of Hedong and Chief Controller of the three commanderies of Hedong, Henan and Pingyang.

By 319, Wei Gai's troops were severely starved and exhausted after repeated attacks from the Han army. He considered leading his troops to the south, but his followers all refused, so he fled along to Nanyang. Afterwards, Sima Rui, now emperor (posthumously known as Emperor Yuan), appointed him as Chief Controller of the Vanguard, General Who Pacifies the North and Inspector of Yong province. At the same time, Ma Zhan led Wei Gai's former subordinates to surrender to Liu Yao, but Liu's demands proved harsh while Ma was arrogant and cruel. As a result, his officers and soldiers secretly welcomed Wei Gai back and killed Ma Zhan. Wei Gai brought them to Xinye, where he helped the Jin Inspector of Liang province, Zhou Fang in suppressing the rebel, Du Zeng. For his merits, he was rewarded with the office of Administrator of Shunyang Commandery.

In 322, when the Jin commander, Wang Dun rebelled against Emperor Yuan, the Inspector of Liang, Gan Zhuo sent an envoy to Wei Gai for his opinion on the matter. Wei Gai said, "I initially fled from rebels so that I could stay loyal to the state. Now, Duke Wang has raised an army against the Emperor. I shall not involve myself in such matter." As a result, Gan Zhuo also refused to side with Wang Dun.

In 326, when the Later Zhao generals, Huang Xiu (黃秀) and Bo Cheng (帛成) attacked Zancheng (酇城; in present-day Laohekou, Hubei), Wei Gai led his followers to retreat to Xiangyang. Afterwards, he was appointed the Inspector of Yong province.

In 327, the general, Su Jun began his rebellion against the imperial court. Wei Gai sided with the loyalists and brought his army to reinforce Jiankang. In 328, Wei Gai marched to Shitou City under the command of the Inspector of Jing province. However, before Su Jun's defeat, Wei Gai became ill and decided to return to Xiangyang. He died en route and was buried in Wuling, while his nephew, Wei Xiong (魏雄) succeeded him.
