= Wei Jun (Jin dynasty) =

Jin dynasty general (died 313)

- 魏浚

Intendant of Henan (河南尹)
- In office 311 – ?
- Monarch: Emperor Min of Jin

Personal details
- Born: Unknown Dong'e County, Shandong
- Died: 313 Mengjin, Luoyang
- Relations: Wei Gai (kinsman)

Wei Jun (died 313) was a military general of the Jin dynasty (266–420). He was a manor lord (塢主; wùzhǔ) during the fall of Western Jin who fought against the Han-Zhao dynasty in the Henan region.

== Life ==
Wei Jun was a native of Dong'a County in Dong Commandery. He initially served as a minor official in Yong province, and when the Prince of Hejian, Sima Yong rose in rebellion in the Guanzhong region, he was appointed by the prince to serve as his General of Military Might. He was later transferred to Colonel of Logistical Affairs, where he distinguished himself.

In 311, during the Disaster of Yongjia, Wei Jun led several hundred refugee families to occupy the stronghold of Xiashi (峽石) in Heyin (河陰; north of present-day Mengjin County, Henan). As the Jin capital, Luoyang came under successive attacks by the forces of Han-Zhao, Wei Jun plundered for grain and presented it to Emperor Huai of Jin. For his contribution, he was appointed General Who Displays Might and Administrator of Pingyang while retaining his logistical responsibility. Despite his office, Wei Jun remained at Xiashi, as in reality, Pingyang was the capital region of the Han.

When Han forces captured and sacked Luoyang later that year, Wei Jun shifted his base to Shiliang Fortress (石梁塢; in present-day Mengjin County, Henan) in northern Luoyang, where he gathered and comforted the survivors while repairing their military equipment. He sent word to those who surrendered to Han in the area, persuading them to return to Jin by arguing that the dynasty's fortunes were long-lasting and bound to recover. Many of them submitted back to Jin, and for those who remained with Han, relying on their remoteness, he sent out his soldiers to force them into submission. As a result, the Jin forces retained some degree of control over the Luoyang region, and many refugees flocked to join Wei Jun, even carrying their children and elderly with them.

At the same time, the Inspector of Bing Province, Liu Kun appointed Wei Jun as the Intendant of Henan. Shortly after, the Grand Commandant, Xun Fan established a provisional government at Mi County, so Wei Jun paid him a visit to discuss military strategies. Xun Fan was pleased and invited the Administrator of Xingyang Commandery based in Xinzheng, Li Ju to participate in their council. Li Ju answered his call, and with Wei Jun and others, they deepened their bonds through discussions and agreed to an alliance before returning home. A junior kinsman of Wei Jun, Wei Gai, also brought with him a host of followers to occupy Fort Yiquan (一泉塢; in modern Luoyang, Henan), where Xun Fan appointed him as General of Military Might.

In 313, the Han general, Liu Yao saw Wei Jun as a threat and besieged his base at Shiliang. The Inspector of Yan Province, Liu Yan and the Administrator of Henei Commandery, Guo Mo dispatched their troops to relieve Wei Jun, but Liu Yao divided his forces and fought them in Hebei county (河北縣; in present-day Yuncheng, Shanxi). Liu Yan and Guo Mo were defeated in an ambush, and their cavalry were all captured. Wei Jun attempted to escape during the night but was caught and killed by Liu Yao.
