= G4015 Danfeng–Ningshan Expressway =

Road in Shaanxi, China

Danfeng–Ningshan Expressway
- 丹凤－宁陕高速公路
- Danning Expressway 丹宁高速公路

Route information
- Auxiliary route of G40

Major junctions
- West end: G65 / G69 in Ningshan County, Ankang, Shaanxi
- East end: G40 in Danfeng County, Shangluo, Shaanxi

Location
- Country: China

Highway system
- National Trunk Highway System; Primary; Auxiliary; National Highways; Transport in China
← G4013	→ G42

The G4015 Danfeng–Ningshan Expressway (Chinese: 丹凤至宁陕高速公路), also referred to as the S30 Danning Expressway (Chinese: 丹宁高速公路), is an expressway in Shaanxi, China that connects the counties of Danfeng and Ningshan.

== 2024 bridge collapse ==
On July 19, 2024, a section of bridge of the Danning highway between Zhashui and Shanyang collapsed due to heavy rainfall; A total of 62 people were killed or went missing in the accident.
