= First encirclement campaign against the Hubei–Henan–Shaanxi Soviet =

1935 military campaign

- Part of the Chinese Civil War
Date	January, 1935 - February 5, 1935
Location	Border region of Hubei, Henan, and Shaanxi provinces, China
Result	Communist victory

Belligerents
National Revolutionary Army	Chinese Red Army

Commanders and leaders
Liu Yanbiao	Xu Haidong

Strength
>6,700	2,500

Casualties and losses
1,200	Low

The first encirclement campaign against the Hubei–Henan–Shaanxi Soviet was an encirclement campaign launched by the Nationalist Government of China against the Communist Party's Hubei–Henan–Shaanxi Soviet and its local Red Army. The Red Army successfully defended the Soviet against Nationalist attacks from January to February 5, 1935.

== Order of battle ==
- National Revolutionary Army (NRA): (6,500 total):
  - 116th Brigade
  - 126th Brigade
  - 2nd Garrison Brigade
- Chinese Red Army: (2,500 total):
  - 25th Army

== Situation ==
In late January, 1935, the Nationalist 126th Brigade and the 2nd Garrison Brigade occupied regions to the east and to the south of Zhen'an County as they began their encirclement campaign against the local Communists. The 25th Army of the Chinese Red Army only number around 2,500 and simply could not face an enemy almost twice its strength. The Communists decided to trick the enemy into dispersing its forces and then destroy them by concentrating their own forces. To do so, the Communists deployed their forces to the region of the Yuanjiagoukou (袁家沟口) by marching northward from the border region of Shanyang and Yunxi. The Communist force subsequently moved to the region of Fenghuangzui, suddenly appearing directly behind the enemy line.

On January 31, 1935, the town of Zuoshui fell into Communist hands, forcing the Nationalist 2nd Garrison Brigade to move westward to reinforce the region, thus the Communists had successfully achieved their objective of dispersing the enemy. On February 1, 1935, as the 252nd Regiment of the Nationalist 116th Brigade reached the region of Caiyuyao, it was ambushed by the waiting enemy and one battalion of the 252nd Regiment of the Nationalist 116th Brigade completely annihilated while the other two were badly mauled. The Communists subsequently withdrew to Gepai Town to rest and regroup.

On February 5, 1935, the Nationalist commander-in-chief Liu Yanbiao, the commander of the Nationalist 116th Brigade, personally led the 251st Regiment and 248th Regiment of the Nationalist 116th Brigade to attack Gepai Town, in attempt to avenge the previous annihilation of the 252nd Regiment of the 116th Brigade. The Communists first checked the Nationalist advance at the Wengo Ridge by taking advantage of the terrain, and then launched their counterassault on the front and left flank. After two battalions were completely annihilated by the Communist onslaught, the Nationalist morale collapsed and the Nationalist troops fled southward. This final Nationalist defeat marked the end of the first encirclement campaign against Hubei–Henan–Sichuan Soviet.

The Nationalist defeat in the campaign cost them over 1,200 casualties and in addition, five counties in southern Shaanxi that were originally plagued heavily with Communist guerrilla activities had since become communist bases, resulting in the expansion of the Hubei–Henan–Sichuan Soviet.

== See also ==
- Outline of the Chinese Civil War
- National Revolutionary Army
- History of the People's Liberation Army
