= YNX =

YNX may refer to:

- Snap Lake Airport, the IATA code YNX
- Yunxi County, the administration division code
- YNX, a mixtape by Yuno Miles
