= Xun Zu =

Official of the Jin dynasty

- 荀組

Grand Protector (太保)
- In office 318 – 322
- Monarch: Emperor Yuan of Jin

Personal details
- Born: 258 Xuchang, Henan
- Died: 322 Nanjing, Jiangsu
- Spouse: Hua Tiao
- Relations: Xun Fan (older brother)
- Children: Xun Yi
- Parent: Xun Xu (father)
- Courtesy name: Taizhang (泰章)
- Peerage: Duke of Linying County (臨潁縣公)
- Posthumous name: Yuan (元)

Xun Zu (258 – 322) was an official of the Jin dynasty (266–420). He was the younger brother of Xun Fan, the head of the provisional government in the Henan region during the fall of Western Jin. Xun Zu succeeded his brother after the latter's death in 313, before he was eventually driven out by the Han-Zhao general, Shi Le and fled to the south, where he joined the new Eastern Jin government.

== Life ==
Xun Zu was from the prestigious Xun clan of Yingchuan as the son of the Minister of Works, Xun Xu. When he was 20 years old, he met the Grand Commandant, Wang Yan, who praised him "elegant and refined". Xun Zu began his career as a Left Assistant in the Office of the Grand Tutor and Retainer to the Crown Prince. He was later invited by the Minister of Works, Wang Hun to become an Assistant Officer of the Household and was further promoted to Chief Clerk of the Left. Afterwards, he served as Zhongshuzi to the Crown Prince and Administrator of Xingyang Commandery.

In 300, the Prince of Zhao, Sima Lun rose to power as Prime Minister after overthrowing Empress Jia and taking control over Emperor Hui of Jin. To enhance his reputation and improve his standings, he endorsed several exemplary and influential figures within his territory, such as Xun Zu, who he assigned as his Right Chief Clerk. The following year, when he usurped the throne, he made Xun Zu a Palace Attendant.

Sima Lun's usurpation soon began a series of civil wars between the imperial princes in northern China. In 304, the Prince of Changsha, Sima Ai, who controlled Luoyang and Emperor Hui, was defeated by the Prince of Chengdu, Sima Ying. The emperor sent Xun Zu along with another official, Lüqiu Chong (閭丘沖) to offer their condolences and praises to Sima Ying's army.

Later that year, the Prince of Hejian, Sima Yong sent his general, Zhang Fang to forcibly relocate Emperor Hui of Jin from Luoyang to his base in Chang'an. During this time, Xun Zu was appointed Intendant of Henan and then promoted to Master of Writing. Subsequently, he was transferred to Commandant of the Imperial Guards, enfeoffed as the Baron of Chengyang County and given the additional titles of Regular Mounted Attendant and Supervisor of the Palace Writers.

Xun Zu was then moved to Colonel-Director of Retainers with the additional titles of Specially Advanced and Household Counsellor. During this time, Xun Zu worked closely with the emperor and was a powerful minister alongside his elder brother, Xun Fan. The brothers often indirectly criticized the imperial court, which repeatedly fell into power struggles despite the empire being in a state of great turmoil due to the ongoing rebellions and famines.

In 311, Xun Zu was once again serving as a Palace Attendant as well as Grand Guardian of the Heir Apparent, but before he could accept them, Luoyang and Emperor Huai of Jin were both captured by Han-Zhao forces in the Disaster of Yongjia. Xun Zu and Xun Fan fled from Huanyuan Pass (轘轅關; approximately 3 kilometers northwest of the Shaolin Monastery in Henan) and escaped to Yangcheng (陽城; in present-day Dengfeng, Henan). Soon, he helped his brother establish a provisional government at Mi County in Xingyang Commandery, where they issued a proclamation throughout the empire electing the Prince of Langya, Sima Rui at Jiankang as the leader of their alliance. Around the same time, the Inspector of You province, Wang Jun, who had plans to claim the throne, appointed Xun Zu as Colonel-Director of Retainers.

In 312, Sima Ye was acclaimed the new Crown Prince at Chang'an. As Xun Zu was his uncle, he officially appointed Xun as Colonel-Director of Retainers and Inspector of Yu province. He also followed Xun Fan when he moved their base from Xingyang to Kaifeng.

In 313, Sima Ye ascended the throne (posthumously known as Emperor Min) while Xun Fan died in Kaifeng, leaving Xun Zu as the new head of their government. In 314, through imperial decree, Xun Zu was appointed Minister over the Masses and Left Supervisor of the Masters of Writing while retaining his old positions and inheriting Xun Fan's authority over all provinces and commanderies. His peerage was also elevated to Duke of Linying County, while his mother was made Grand Lady and an heir apparent was established for him.

In 315, Xun Fan was promoted to Grand Commandant and Governor of Yu province. At the time, through Sima Rui's authority, he was made Chief Controller of military affairs in Si province and Regular Mounted Attendant while his other titles remained unchanged. Xun Zu was also appointed Prefect of the Masters of Writing, but he submitted a memorial declining the position.

After Chang'an fell and Emperor Min was captured in 316, Xun Zu issued a proclamation throughout the empire calling for unity to fight the rebels. The following year, he along with several other officials urged Sima Rui to ascend the imperial throne, but he refused. The prince, after consulting with Minister of Ceremonies, He Xun, commissioned Xun Zu as the Minister of Works for his loyalty and services.

In 318, the Han general Shi Le repeatedly attacked Xun Zu, gradually eroding his control over his domain. Eventually, Xun Zu decided to abandon Xuchang with several hundred men and crossed the Yangtze river, after which he gathered a thousand infantry and a hundred cavalry to organize into an army. The imperial court acknowledged Xun Zu's forces, and when he reached the new capital, Jiankang, Sima Rui, who by then had declared himself emperor (posthumously Emperor Yuan), appointed him as Grand Protector and Manager of the Affairs of the Masters of Writing.

In 319, Emperor Yuan gathered his ministers to discuss building a new sacrificial site in the Southern Suburbs. The Prefect of the Masters of Writing, Diao Xie and others that sacrifices should only be conducted once the capital was returned to Luoyang, but Xun Zu and the rest rebutted by saying, "When Emperor Xian was in Xuchang, he immediately performed sacrifices at the Southern Suburbs. Why should we wait to return to Luoyang?" Emperor Yuan sided with Xun Zu's group and built an altar south of the walls of Jiankang.

In 322, Xun Zu was selected as the new Grand Commandant and Grand Guardian of the Heir Apparent, but died before he could accept the offices. He was given the posthumous name of Yuan, and he was succeeded by his son, Xun Yi (荀奕).
