= Hubei–Henan–Shaanxi Revolutionary Base Area =

Chinese Soviet (c. 1930s)

Hubei–Henan–Shaanxi Revolutionary Base Area 鄂豫陕革命根据地
- Revolutionary base area of the Chinese Soviet Republic
- 1934–1937
- Capital: Shangluo, Shaanxi
- Historical era: Chinese Civil War
  - Established: 10 December 1934
  - Disestablished: December 1937

The Hubei–Henan–Shaanxi Revolutionary Base Area, or the Eyushaan Revolutionary Base Area (simplified Chinese: 鄂豫陕革命根据地; traditional Chinese: 鄂豫陝革命根據地; pinyin: È-yù-shǎn Gémìng Gēnjùdì) was a Communist-controlled revolutionary base area (simplified Chinese: 革命根据地; traditional Chinese: 革命根據地; pinyin: gémìng gēnjùdì) in north-central China that existed from late 1934 to 1937. It was a constituent part of the Chinese Soviet Republic, a self-declared sovereign state within the Republic of China. The revolutionary base was located in the mountainous tri-provincial border region between Hubei, Henan, and Shaanxi, from which it gets its name. It spanned a contiguous area including parts of present-day Shiyan in Hubei, Sanmenxia and Nanyang in Henan, and Shangluo and Ankang, in Shaanxi.

Red Army forces first took the area on December 8, 1934, and declared the establishment of the revolutionary base area two days later. During its existence, the Eyushaan Revolutionary Base Area faced near-continuous attacks from the Nationalist army and local anti-communist guerillas. Following the Xi'an Incident, which helped create the Second United Front, Red Army forces from the area left the area to join the front lines against the Japanese invasion.

== History ==
On November 11, 1934, the 25th Army of the Chinese Red Army declared their intent to form the Eyushaan Revolutionary Base Area as part of their retreat from the former Eyuwan Soviet. More than 2,900 soldiers took part in the march, leaving from Luoshan County in Henan. From November 1934 through July 1935, the 25th Army, alongside local pro-communist guerilla forces, established control over the counties of Lushi, Xixia and Xichuan in Henan, Yunxi in Hubei, and Xunyang, Foping, Yang, Chang'an, and Lantian in Shaanxi. On December 8, 1934, the 25th Army joined forces with local members of the Big Swords Society to take Luonan County in Shaanxi. On December 10th, the Communist Party declared the creation of the Eyushaan Revolutionary Base Area, and declared Shangluo its capital. These combined forces then went south to conquer Yunxi County in Hubei, then returned north to Luonan County, traveled east to take Lushi County, and then west to Lantian County. Upon establishing control in these regions during the month of December, as well as in parts of then-Zhen'an County (now part of Shanyang County), the combined forces turned their efforts to fighting local anti-communist guerilla forces. During this time, Red Army fighter Chen Xianrui instructed local Red Army forces, as well as their allied counterparts, to earn local support by resisting donations, extracting debt, taking grain, charging rent, and avoid conscripting locals. In January 1935, Red Army forces defeated anti-communist guerilla forces in the counties of Yunxi, Xunyang, Zhen'an, and Shanyang, enabling the Communist Party to establish local soviets.

In 1935, the base area was the object of two Nationalist Government Encirclement Campaigns in 1935, both of which failed. Uniquely in the history of these campaigns, the target Soviet was then let be: its forces and apparatus were neither destroyed nor driven out by subsequent strategy. This may be due to the Long March then concluding, which made much of Shaanxi into a fairly secure, Soviet Union-backed territory for the Chinese Communists.

On September 9, 1935, the 25th Army migrated north as part of the Long March. The local Communist forces decided to unite remaining local guerilla forces as the Red 74th Division (simplified Chinese: 红七十四师; traditional Chinese: 紅七十四師; pinyin: Hóng Qīshísì Shī). Over the following year, the Red 74th Division engaged the Nationalist army in numerous battles, and grew in size from about 700 to 1,700 troops.

Following the Xi'an Incident in December 1936, the Central Committee of the Chinese Communist Party ordered the Red Army to move north to fight the Japanese invasion of China. By January 1937, the Red 74th Division left the area.
