= Li Ju (Jin dynasty) =

Jin dynasty general and warlord (died 325)

- 李矩

General of the Serrated Gates (牙門)
- In office ?–?
- Monarch: Emperor Hui of Jin

Administrator of Xingyang (滎陽太守)
- In office 311 – 325
- Monarch: Emperor Min of Jin/Emperor Yuan of Jin/Emperor Ming of Jin

Champion General (冠軍將軍)
- In office 311 – ?
- Monarch: Emperor Min of Jin

Inspector of Sizhou (司州刺史)
- In office 320 – 325
- Monarch: Emperor Yuan of Jin/Emperor Ming of Jin

Personal details
- Born: Unknown Linfen, Shanxi
- Died: 325
- Relations: Guo Song (nephew)
- Courtesy name: Shihui (世回)
- Peerage: Marquis of Yangwu County (陽武縣侯)

Li Ju (died c.July 325), courtesy name Shihui, was a Chinese military general and warlord of the Jin dynasty (266–420). During and after the fall of Western Jin, he was a manor lord (塢主; wùzhǔ) in the northern Henan region who fought for control with the Han-Zhao and Later Zhao states over the former Jin capital, Luoyang, which had been lost after the Disaster of Yongjia in 311. He had much success initially, even briefly recovering the city at one point, but was eventually overwhelmed and forced to withdraw. While attempting to join the Eastern Jin dynasty at Jiankang in 325, he was involved in a horse riding accident and died from his injuries.

== Early life ==
Li Ju was a native of Pingyang Commandery (平陽; west of present-day Linfen, Shanxi). When he was a child, it was said that he displayed adult-like leadership whenever he played with the other children. After growing up, he became a local official and was later appointed by Sima Rong as a General of the Serrated Gates for escorting his county prefect to Chang'an. Li distinguished himself during the campaign against Qi Wannian in the late 290s, which earned him the title of Marquis of Dongming Village.

When he returned to Pingyang, he was made the commandery's new Protector. It was then when an attempt on Li's life was made. The Administrator of Pingyang, Song Zhou (宋胄), wanted to replace Li with his kinsman Wu Ji (吳畿). Li thus pretended to be ill to allow Wu to replace him. Wu received the position, but became afraid that Li may one day return to retake his office. For good measures, Wu sent an assassin after Li but with the help of a friend, he barely escaped with his life.

== As a manor lord ==
Amidst the War of the Eight Princes, the tribes of the Five Divisions in Bing province rebelled and established the Han-Zhao dynasty in 304. Pingyang was hit hardest by the rebellion, and many of locals fled while others went to join Li Ju, who they recognized as their manor lord. Soon, refugees from other parts of the north affected by war flocked to Li Ju due to his reputation. He and his followers later moved east to Xingyang and then to Xinzheng. The Prince of Donghai, Sima Yue, took notice of his presence and made him Administrator (太守) of Ruyin (汝陰, in modern Fuyang, Anhui). (Note: Many classical works on Chinese calligraphy and its history (e.g. Shu Duan [书断]) cited this position when describing Wei Shuo's husband of the same name.) In 307, Li Ju was ordered by Sima Yue to fix the Qianjin Dam (千金堨) at Luoyang with Yuan Fu (袁孚) to improve supply routes.

=== Conflicts with bandits and Shi Le ===
Luoyang and Emperor Huai of Jin were captured by Han forces in 311. The Minister of Works, Xun Fan and Guard General Hua Hui (華薈) fled to Yangcheng (陽城; in present-day Dengfeng, Henan) and Chenggao respectively. However, these two areas were badly affected by famine, and bandit leaders such as Hou Dou (侯都) took to cannibalism and killed anyone they could find to eat them. Fortunately for Xun Fan and Hua Hui, Li Ju campaigned against the bandits and crushed them. Afterwards, he helped Xun Fan and Hua Hui by providing their followers with camps and houses along with grains.

After Xun Fan set up a provisional government at Mi County, he appointed Li Ju to become the Administrator of Xingyang. Meanwhile, another manor lord named Wei Jun decided to visit Xun Fan and discuss military affairs. Li was invited to come as well but his subordinates warned him not to trust Wei Jun and not to travel at night. He told them, "Loyal ministers have the same mind, there should be no doubt." During the visit, Xun, Li and Wei formed a friendship and Li left the meeting unharmed.

Later that year, the Han general Shi Le invaded Xingyang. Li devised a plan where he led the old and weak to hide in the hills and let the cattle and horses roam freely. When Shi Le's men arrived, they found no one to attack and decided to capture the animals their own use instead. However, this proved a difficult task, and the soldiers became disorganized as they try to capture as many animals that they could find. It was then when Li let out a cry and his troops came out from the hills to ambush the enemies. Shi Le was badly routed and forced into a retreat. For his victory, Xun Fan petitioned the Prince of Lanya, Sima Rui to make Li a Champion General and promoted him to Marquis of Yangwu County.

The famine began to worsen, and a large group of bandits from Chang'an swarmed to Li Ju's territory. Li and his generals fought them and managed to turn them away. These bandits had thousands of women under their captivity, so Li freed them all. His generals told him that they should keep the women for themselves, seeing that they were not a part of Li's care. However, Li told them, "They are all wives of those who serve the state, what right do we have to hold them?" Li then returned the women to their respective homes.

In 314, the manor lord and Administrator of Henan, Guo Mo, came under attack from Liu Yao. His city was running low of food, so he sent an envoy to Li Ju asking if he could retreat to Xinzheng. Li Ju allowed him and sent his nephew, Guo Song to rescue him. However, Guo Song could not engage with Liu Yao's army as he had very few troops. Coincidentally, Zhang Zhao (張肇), the Army Advisor to the Jin Inspector of Bingzhou Liu Kun, was returning from Chang'an after failing to relief it. Li Ju contacted him to send his nephew help, so Zhang Zhao led his Xianbei cavalry to attack Liu Yao. Liu Yao retreated without a fight, and Guo Mo was safely escorted to Xinzheng.

=== Battle of Xingyang ===
In 317, the Han general Liu Chang (劉暢) marched his troops to Xingyang. Li camped himself at the rampart that was built by a King of Han in ancient times. When Liu was close by, he sent an envoy to Li provoking him to come out. Li had no time to prepare his defences and was caught by surprise. Thus, Li sent envoys to the Han general feigning surrender. Thinking that he had won, Liu lowered his defences and celebrated with his men.

Li planned for a night raid, but his soldiers were all unsure if it could work out. Because of this, Li had Guo Song pray at a shrine of Zichan, and Guo brought back a shaman who told them that Zichan will spiritually aid them in battle. Morale rose, and soon many of Li's men volunteered to participate in the assault. Guo Song led the surprise attack on Liu Chang's camp, killing many of the enemy troops while Liu Chang escaped with an inch of his life. Guo Mo also sent his younger brother Guo Zhi (郭芝) to help, so Song instructed him to chase after Liu Chang's fleeing men. Zhi did so and captured many of the enemy soldiers before returning.

== War over Luoyang ==
Within Liu's abandoned camp, Li Ju found an edict from the Emperor of Han Liu Cong instructing Liu Chang to march to Luoyang, execute the general Zhao Gu (趙固) and have him replaced with Zhao's Chief Clerk Zhou Zhen (周振) after defeating Li. Prior to this, Zhao Gu was already on bad terms with Zhou Zhen, so when Li sent the edict to him, he had Zhou and his children executed. Zhao then personally met with Li to surrender, so Li ordered him to return to Luoyang to defend the city. Zhao Gu and Guo Mo raided Hedong Commandery and received thousands of refugees fleeing from Han. Later, Luoyang was attacked by Liu Yasheng (劉雅生), causing Zhao Gu to fall back to Mount Yangcheng (陽城山).

In 318, Li Ju sent Guo Mo and Guo Song to reinforce Zhao Gu from Luorui (洛汭, in modern-day Luonan County, Shaanxi). Guo Song ordered his generals led by Geng Zhi (耿稚) to cross the Yellow River and raid Liu Can's camp. Initially, Geng successfully attacked from all directions and captured many camps, but by dawn, Liu Can realized how little troops Geng actually had, so he viciously led the counter-attack and neither side got the upper hand for the next few days. Li Ju marched to support Geng, but Liu Can's forces formed a defensive line along the Yellow River that prevented him from crossing. Geng destroyed as many supplies as possible in the Han camps he captured before breaking through the lines and fleeing to Hulao. For his achievements, Li was made Chief Controller of Henan, Xingyang, and Hongnong.

Later that year, Liu Cong died and was succeeded by Liu Can. However, Liu Can was killed in a coup led by Jin Zhun. Zhun sent an envoy to Li Ju with a letter denouncing the Liu clan and informing him that the imperial coffins were being transported south to Jiankang. Li notified Sima Rui of this, who later sent his ministers to welcome the imperial coffins. However, Jin Zhun was eventually defeated by a coalition led by Liu Yao and Shi Le later that year. Liu Yao succeeded Liu Can but in 319, Shi Le broke away and formed Later Zhao. Zhao Gu also died that year, leaving Guo Song to defend Luorui on his own. Song changed his base to Yangdi, where he faced multiple attacks from Shi Le's son, Shi Sheng. In all their encounters, Guo Song was the victor.

In 320, the Han commanders guarding Luoyang, Yin An (尹安), Song Shi (宋始), Song Shu (宋恕), and Zhao Shen (趙愼) all decided to surrender to Later Zhao. Shi Le sent Shi Sheng to support them, but the commanders changed their minds and surrendered to Li Ju instead. Guo Mo was sent to reinforce Luoyang. She Sheng felt that it would be risky to attack Luoyang on his own, so he settled with capturing Song Shi's army before retreating north. The people of Henan fled to Li Ju, and Luoyang was virtually abandoned.

== Defeat and death ==
In 324, Shi Sheng attacked Guo Song, but was once again defeated. In response, Shi Cong and Shi Liang (石良) rushed to rescue him. Guo Mo was struggling against Shi Cong, so he sent his Army Advisor Zheng Xiong (鄭雄) to Li Ju suggesting that they should surrender to Liu Yao, but Li rejected the proposal. Later, Li himself was defeated in an ambush set by Shi Liang. Guo Song's younger brother, Guo Yuan (郭元) had been captured by Zhao troops and was sent to deliver a demoralizing message to Li, offering him the chance to surrender. However, Guo Song encouraged Li to continue fighting. Shi Sheng camped in Luoyang and plundered Henan. The situation worsened for Li as his rations were beginning to run dry. Guo Mo once again asked him to surrender to Liu Yao, and this time he agreed. Liu Yao sent reinforcements in the form of Liu Yue (劉岳) and Huyan Mo (呼延謨), but they were severely routed by Later Zhao forces.

Guo Mo was defeated by Shi Cong again, causing him to abandon his post and secretly make his way to Jiankang. When Li Ju found out, he was furious. He sent Guo Song and his generals to chase after him, but not before telling his nephew, "Do you know the saying, "If the lips are gone, the teeth will grow cold"? It was because of you that I was able to welcome Guo Mo, but now he flees in the face of danger. You must stop him at once!" Guo Song pursued Guo Mo all the way to Xiangcheng, where Guo Mo abandoned his wife and children before continuing his flight south. Song could no longer catch up with Mo, so he took Mo's family back with him to Li Ju.

Nearly all of Li Ju's men were considering to defect to Later Zhao at this point. Thus, Li had no other choice but to retreat south and join up with the government in Jiankang. Along the way, many of his soldiers chose to abandon him, and only more than a hundred people chose to remain with him, including Guo Song. When Li Ju's party reached Luyang, he accidentally fell off his horse and died. Li was buried at Mount Xian (峴山) at Xiangyang.
