= Xun Fan =

Maternal uncle of Emperor Min of Jin (245-313)

- 荀藩

Minister of Works (司空)
- In office 311 – 313
- Monarch: Emperor Huai of Jin

Personal details
- Born: 245 Xuchang, Henan
- Died: c.October 313 Kaifeng, Henan
- Relations: Xun Zu (younger brother)
- Children: Xun Sui; Xun Kai
- Parent: Xun Xu (father)
- Courtesy name: Dajian (大堅)
- Peerage: Duke of Xihua County (西華縣公)
- Posthumous name: Cheng (成)

Xun Fan (245 – c.October 313), courtesy name Dajian, was a minister of the Jin dynasty (266–420). A member of the prominent Xun clan of Yingchuan, he grew to become a chief official within the imperial court and was the Minister of Works at the time of the Disaster of Yongjia in 311. With Emperor Huai of Jin and the capital of Luoyang lost, he founded a provisional government in Mi County, through which he empowered the prince of Langya, Sima Rui by appointing him leader among remnants of the Jin. He was also the maternal uncle of Emperor Min of Jin.

== Life ==
=== Background ===
Xun Fan was born into the Xun clan of Yingchuan commandery during the reign of Cao Fang, as the son of Xun Xu, who eventually became a high-ranking minister of the Jin dynasty. When Xun Fan was about four years old, Sima Yi seized power in Cao Wei via a coup. As the Sima clan continued to tighten their control throughout the 250s and early 260s under Sima Yi's sons Sima Shi and Sima Zhao, Xun Xu aligned himself with the Sima clan, although Xun Fan's activities during this period were poorly documented. In September 265, Sima Zhao died, leaving his son Sima Yan as regent of Cao Wei. About five months later in February 266, Sima Yan usurped the throne from Cao Huan, establishing the Jin dynasty; Yan himself would be posthumously known as Emperor Wu of Jin. Xun Fan's activities during Emperor Wu's reign were also poorly documented; when Emperor Wu died in May 290, Xun Fan was about 45 years old.

Xun Fan was appointed a Gentleman of the Yellow Gate during the Yuankang era (元康, 291–299) of the reign of Emperor Hui of Jin, Emperor Wu's son and successor. Prior to Xun Fan's appointment, Xun Xu had been instructed to craft a bell. However, as Xun Xu died in late 289, the imperial court ordered Xun Fan to take up his father's task. Xun Fan was able to complete the bell, and it was used for rituals and ceremonies.

=== War of the Eight Princes ===
In January 303, Xun Fan joined the prince of Changsha, Sima Ai when he fought and defeated the prince of Qi, Sima Jiong in Luoyang. For his contributions, Xun Fan was enfeoffed as the Duke of Xihua County and later promoted to Supervisor of the Masters of Writing.

In August 304, Xun Fan followed the prince of Donghai, Sima Yue during his ill-fated campaign against the prince of Chengdu, Sima Ying, in which Emperor Hui of Jin also followed. After they were routed at the Battle of Dangyin, he accompanied Emperor Hui along with the Minister Over the Masses, Wang Rong and the prince of Yuzhang, Sima Chi when they were brought to Sima Ying's base in Ye. Later that year, the alliance of the chief controller of You province, Wang Jun and the Inspector of Bing province, Sima Teng attacked Ye and caused Sima Ying to flee to Luoyang, bringing Xun Fan and the others with him.

In 305, Zhang Fang a general under the prince of Hejian, Sima Yong, forcibly moved Emperor Hui and Sima Ying from Luoyang to Chang'an. Xun Fan remained behind in Luoyang, and together with the colonel-director, Liu Tun and Intendant of Henan, Zhou Fu, he was entrusted with managing political affairs in the city on behalf of the emperor. There were thus essentially two courts; Chang'an was referred to as the "Western Court" (西臺) while Luoyang was referred to as the "Eastern Court" (東臺). Late that year, Sima Yong issued an edict ordering Empress Yang Xianrong to commit suicide, as dissidents in Luoyang were using her name to rebel. Xun Fan and the others opposed the decision, arguing that the empress was being closely monitored under house arrest with no intention herself to rebel, and killing her would only tarnish the prince's reputation. Sima Yong angrily had one of the opposing ministers, Liu Tun marked for arrest, but took no further action and seemingly cancelled his order.

Sima Yue emerged victorious in the War of the Eight Princes by January 307. When Emperor Huai of Jin ascended the throne that same year, Xun Fan was appointed as the junior tutor to the crown prince. On 25 December 308, he replaced the Prefect of the Masters of Writing, Gao Guang (高光; son of Gao Rou) after Gao died of illness on 3 December.

=== Provisional government ===
In 311, Xun Fan was promoted to the position of Minister of Works. However, before he could settle into his post, Luoyang came under attack by Han-Zhao forces. Xun Fan and his younger brother, Xun Zu fled through the Huanyuan Pass (轘轅關; approximately 3 kilometers northwest of the Shaolin Monastery in Henan) to Yangcheng (陽城; in present-day Dengfeng, Henan), while Luoyang and Emperor Huai of Jin fell into the hands of Han in the Disaster of Yongjia. At Yangcheng, Xun Fan and his followers were harassed by bandits, many who reportedly wanted to kill them for their flesh as they had been driven to starvation by the ongoing famine in the area. The refugee leader in Xinzheng, Li Ju, defeated these bandits and helped Xun Fan by building residences and providing grain for his followers.

Xun Fan soon moved to Mi County in Xingyang, where he established a provisional government. He sent out proclamations throughout the empire, issuing a call to arms and appointing the prince of Langya, Sima Rui in Yang province as the leader of their alliance. Sima Rui's imperial power was expanded further as Xun Fan authorized him to appoint and dismiss chief officials. Xun Fan also assigned his kinsman, Xun Song as the administrator of Xiangcheng, Li Ju as the administrator of Xingyang and Chu Sha as the interior minister of Liangguo. The intendant of Henan, Wei Jun, who was appointed to the position by the Inspector of Bing province, Liu Kun went to visit Xun Fan to discuss strategy. Xun Fan was pleased and also invited Li Ju to join in their military council. Through their discussions, the parties became close friends with one another before departing, and Xun Fan made Wei Jun's kinsman, Wei Gai the General of Military Might.

Not long after, the eleven-year-old Prince of Qin, Sima Ye, who was also Xun Fan's maternal nephew, fled to join his uncle at Mi County. As Mi County was close to Han territory, Xun Fan decided to relocate south to Xuchang. At the time, the Inspector of You province, Wang Jun had also set up his own provisional government and appointed Xun Fan as grand commandant of the acting court.

When Xun Fan was at Mi County, he had appointed a refugee leader from Tianshui Commandery, Yan Ding as the Inspector of Yu province as he commanded a sizeable following under him. Yan Ding followed Xun Fan when he relocated to Xuchang. Around this time, news of Jin resistance on the brink of recapturing Chang'an in the Guanzhong region reached Xuchang, and Yan Ding had ambitions to bring Sima Ye back to his hometown and proclaim him as emperor. Yan Ding made preparations to depart west with Sima Ye, but Xun Fan and his fellow officials, who were all natives of the east, were reluctant to follow him and decided to scatter. Yan Ding's soldiers pursued them; although a few of them were killed, Xun Fan and Xun Zu survived, and they both moved back to Xingyang.

=== Death ===
Sima Ye was able to reach Chang'an, which had been recaptured by Jin forces, and he was acclaimed as the new crown prince in 312. After his ascension, he ordered Xun Fan to guard Kaifeng, where he would supervise affairs both near and far. His final recorded act was appointing Li Shu (李述) as the Inspector of Yan province in 313. He soon died in Kaifeng that year at the age of 69 (by East Asian reckoning), and he was posthumously awarded the office of Grand Protector and posthumously named "Cheng" (成). He was succeeded by his brother, Xun Zu, who remained in Kaifeng before joining the Eastern Jin south of the Yangtze river in 318. Xun Fan also had two sons, Xun Sui (荀邃) and Xun Kai (荀闓).
