= Gao Yao =

Gao Yao may refer to:

- Gao Yao (minister) (臯陶), a Chinese mythological figure who served the kings of the Xia dynasty
- Gao Yao (footballer) (高尧; born 1978), former Chinese footballer
- Gaoyao District (高要), an urban district of Zhaoqing in western Guangdong, China
- Gaoyao, Shaanxi (高耀), a town in Luonan County, Shaanxi, China
