= Guanyin, Hubei =

Town in Hubei, China

Guanyin 观音镇
- Town
- Location in Hubei
- Coordinates: 32°54′0″N 110°22′8″E
- Country: People's Republic of China
- Province: Hubei
- Prefecture-level city: Shiyan
- County: Yunxi County

Population (2010)
  - Total: 32,135
- Time zone: UTC+8 (China Standard)

Guanyin (simplified Chinese: 观音镇; traditional Chinese: 觀音鎮; pinyin: Guānyīn zhèn) is a town in Yunxi County, Hubei province, China. Guanyin has a population of 32,135 as of 2010, and administers 22 villages.

== Administrative divisions ==
As of 2020, it has 22 villages under its administration:

- Guanyin Village (观音村)
- Longqiao Village (龙桥村)
- Liujiawan Village (刘家湾村)
- Pengjiawan Village (彭家湾村)
- Niu'ershan Village (牛儿山村)
- Goukou Village (沟口村)
- Zhonggou Village (中沟村)
- Zhifanggou Village (纸坊沟村)
- Tianhekou Village (天河口村)
- Yaziwan Village (垭子湾村)
- Huomaigou Village (火麦沟村)
- Huangtuliang Village (黄土梁村)
- Xiangou Village (县沟村)
- Zhicao Village (纸槽村)
- Xiataoyuan Village (下桃园村)
- Wanshousi Village (万寿寺村)
- Fodong Village (佛洞村)
- Shuangzhangping Village (双掌坪村)
- Nangou Village (南沟村)
- Tulinggou Village (土岭沟村)
- Songshuping Village (松树坪村)
- Wudingping Village (五顶坪村)

== Demographics ==
Guanyin has a population of 32,135 according to the 2010 Chinese Census, up from the 27, 813 recorded in the 2000 Chinese Census.

The town has a hukou population of 39,742 as of 2019, up slightly from 39,564 in 2018.

== See also ==
- List of township-level divisions of Hubei
