= Xun Xu =

Chinese official, musician, writer and painter (c.221–289)

- 荀勗 / 荀勖

Prefect of the Masters of Writing (尚書令)
- In office c. 280 – 289
- Monarch: Emperor Wu of Jin

Household Counsellor (光祿大夫)
- In office ?–?
- Monarch: Emperor Wu of Jin

Zhuzuo (著作)
- In office 266–?
- Monarch: Emperor Wu of Jin

Palace Attendant (侍中)
- In office 266–?
- Monarch: Emperor Wu of Jin
- In office 264–266
- Monarch: Cao Huan

Supervisor of the Palace Writers (中書監)
- In office 266–?
- Monarch: Emperor Wu of Jin

Official in the Hall of Records (記室)
- In office ?–?
- Monarch: Cao Mao / Cao Huan

Judge under the Minister of Justice (廷尉正)
- In office ?–?
- Monarch: Cao Mao / Cao Huan

Assistant Palace Gentleman (從事中郎)
- In office ?–?
- Monarch: Cao Fang / Cao Mao

Prefect of Anyang (安陽令)
- In office ?–?
- Monarch: Cao Fang / Cao Mao

Personal details
- Born: Unknown (Note: While Xun Xu's birth year is not recorded, his biography indicated that he was brought up by Zhong Yao, and that Zhong was still alive when he was around 10 (by East Asian reckoning). Since Zhong died in 230, Xun Xu's birth year should be in or before 221.)
- Died: December 289
- Relations: Zhong Yao (granduncle); See Xun family of Yingchuan
- Children: Xun Ji; Xun Fan; Xun Zu; Wu Tong's wife; Mother of Emperor Min of Jin; two other unnamed sons
- Parents: Xun Xi (father); Zhong Yao's niece (mother)
- Occupation: Musician, painter, politician, writer
- Courtesy name: Gongzeng (公曾)
- Posthumous name: Marquis Cheng (成侯)

Xun Xu (c. 221 – 289), courtesy name Gongzeng, was a Chinese musician, painter, politician, and writer who lived during the late Three Kingdoms period and early Jin dynasty of China. Born in the influential Xun family, he was a great-grandson of Xun Shuang and a distant maternal relative of Zhong Yao's family (and Zhong Yao's grandnephew). He served as an official in the state of Cao Wei in the late Three Kingdoms era before serving under the Jin dynasty.

== Family background and early life ==
Xun Xu was born in the eminent Xun family, whose ancestral home was in Yingyin County (潁陰縣), Yingchuan Commandery (穎川郡), which is in present-day Xuchang, Henan. His great-grandfather, Xun Shuang, served as the Minister of Works during the Eastern Han dynasty. His grandfather, Xun Fei (荀棐), served as Colonel of Trainee Archers (射聲校尉).

Xun Xu's father, Xun Xi (荀肸), died early, so Xun Xu was raised by his maternal granduncle Zhong Yao and the Zhong family. Zhong Yao served as the Grand Tutor (太傅) in the imperial court of the state of Wei during the Three Kingdoms period after the end of the Eastern Han dynasty. As a child, Xun Xu was a fast learner and could already write essays when he was only 10. Zhong Yao once remarked that Xun Xu would grow up to become like his great-grandfather Xun Shuang.

Among Xun Xu's relatives, the more notable ones were Xun Yu, Xun Yue and Xun You. Xun Yu and Xun Yue were Xun Xu's first cousins twice removed, (Note: Xun Yu, Xun Yue and Xun Fei (Xun Xu's grandfather) were cousins as they share the same grandfather (Xun Shu).) while Xun You was Xun Xu's third cousin once removed. (Note: Xun You and Xun Xi (Xun Xu's father) were third cousins as their grandfathers (Xun Tan and Xun Shuang) were cousins.) Xun Yu and Xun You were influential statesmen of the late Eastern Han dynasty and advisers to the warlord Cao Cao, who laid the foundation for the state of Wei during the Three Kingdoms period. Xun Yue was an official, historian and Confucian scholar of the late Eastern Han dynasty.

== Service under the Cao Wei state ==
By the time Xun Xu reached adulthood, he was already a learned and knowledgeable young man. He was interested in government and politics so he started his career as an assistant to Cao Shuang, a general serving as regent to Cao Fang, the third emperor of Wei. He was subsequently reassigned to be a communications secretary in the palace secretariat. In February 249, Cao Shuang was executed after losing power in a coup launched by his co-regent, Sima Yi. None of Cao Shuang's former aides dared to collect his remains and arrange a funeral for him because they were afraid of being implicated. Xun Xu stepped up, held a funeral for Cao Shuang, and inspired others to follow him.

Xun Xu later became the Magistrate of Anyang County (安陽縣) and an assistant to the General of Agile Cavalry. During his tenure in Anyang County, Xun Xu gained so much respect and love from the local residents that they even built a shrine to honour him. He was subsequently held the following appointments: Judge under the Minister of Justice (廷尉正), military adviser to the regent Sima Zhao, third regent from the Sima clan, official in the Hall of Records (記室). He was also ennobled as a Secondary Marquis (關內侯).

In June 260, the fourth Wei emperor, Cao Mao, attempted a coup to seize back power from the regent, Sima Zhao, who had been monopolising state power since 255. Sima Zhao's younger brother, Sima Gan, heard of the coup and tried to enter the palace to help his brother. However, he was denied entry by Sun You (孫佑), an officer guarding the main gate, so he had to enter the palace through another gate. When Sima Zhao found out why Sima Gan showed up late, he wanted to execute Sun You and his family. However, Xun Xu advised him against it by pointing out that it would be unfair and unjust to punish Sun You's family as well, given that Cheng Cui's (成倅; brother of Cao Mao's killer Cheng Ji) family was spared. Sima Zhao heeded Xun Xu's advice and punished only Sun You, by demoting him to the status of a commoner.

Around the same time, Lu Yi (路遺), a cavalry officer, requested permission from Sima Zhao to infiltrate Wei's southwestern rival state, Shu Han, and assassinate Shu's leaders. Xun Xu advised Sima Zhao against using assassination because he believed that defeating Shu forces in battle was a better way of convincing the people of Shu to surrender and for Sima Zhao to gain greater prestige. Sima Zhao praised Xun Xu for his sound advice.

In 264, the Wei general Zhong Hui started a rebellion against Sima Zhao after leading Wei forces to conquer Shu. At the time, Sima Zhao only heard rumours about the rebellion and had no concrete evidence yet. As he had all along treated Zhong Hui well, he was reluctant to believe that Zhong would rebel against him. After Xun Xu cautioned him against trusting Zhong Hui, Sima Zhao led his forces to garrison at Chang'an as a precautionary measure. Guo Yi (郭奕; nephew of Guo Huai) and Wang Shen (王深; son of Wang Chang) urged Sima Zhao to banish Xun Xu because they feared that he would side with Zhong Hui, given that he was a relative of and was raised by the Zhong family. (Note: Zhong Hui was Zhong Yao's son. Xun Xu's mother was a daughter of Zhong Yao's brother, and thus Zhong Hui's paternal cousin.) However, Sima Zhao ignored them and continued to treat Xun Xu as he did before, and even allowed Xun Xu to ride in the same carriage as him. Previously, when Sima Zhao ordered Zhong Hui to lead Wei forces to conquer Shu, Xun Xu had nominated Wei Guan to supervise the campaign. Later, Wei Guan played a huge role in suppressing Zhong Hui's rebellion. After Shu region had been pacified, Xun Xu followed Sima Zhao back to the Wei capital, Luoyang, where he, Pei Xiu and Yang Hu were put in charge of the privy council.

After eliminating Shu Han, Sima Zhao planned to conquer Wei's other rival state, Eastern Wu, so he sent an emissary to pass a letter to the Wu emperor, Sun Hao. Sima Zhao had previously ordered his subordinates to draft the letter to Sun Hao. Among the numerous drafts he read, he eventually chose the one written by Xun Xu. Sun Hao agreed to make peace with Wei after reading the letter. Sima Zhao remarked that Xun Xu's letter had the power equivalent to that of an army of 100,000. In mid 264, the fifth Wei emperor, Cao Huan, conferred Sima Zhao the title of a vassal king, "King of Jin" (晉王). Xun Xu was appointed as a Palace Attendant (侍中), and enfeoffed as the Marquis of Anyang (安陽侯) (Note: The Jin Shu mentioned that Xun Xu was enfeoffed as the Viscount of Anyang (安陽子). However, this is most likely an error because Xun Xu was previously already a Secondary Marquis (關內侯). If he was made a viscount, it would be a "demotion" from his previous rank. Moreover, during the Jin dynasty, Emperor Wu enfeoffed Xun Xu's grandson as a village marquis, which outranked a viscount. It does not make sense for the emperor to let a grandson outrank his grandfather in the hierarchy of nobility.) and given 1,000 taxable households for his marquisate.

== Overview of service under the Jin dynasty ==
Following Sima Zhao's death in September 265, in February 266 the Wei emperor Cao Huan abdicated his throne to Sima Zhao's son, Sima Yan, who established the Jin dynasty to replace Wei. After Sima Yan was enthroned and became historically known as Emperor Wu, he enfeoffed Xun Xu as the Duke of Jibei Commandery (濟北郡公). However, Xun Xu declined the enfeoffment after seeing that Yang Hu also declined his. However, he still remained as a marquis under the new title "Marquis of Jibei" (濟北侯). Xun Xu was then concurrently appointed as Supervisor of the Palace Writers (中書監), Palace Attendant (侍中), and zhuzuo (著作; senior writer). The emperor also tasked him and Jia Chong with drafting the laws of the Jin dynasty.

In the early Xianning era (275–280), Emperor Wu named Xun Xu, Shi Bao and others as the pioneers of the Jin dynasty and included them among those honoured in the Jin dynasty's ancestral temple. Around 280, when Wang Jun requested permission to lead an army to conquer Eastern Wu (the last of the Three Kingdoms), Xun Xu and Jia Chong strongly objected but Emperor Wu ignored them and ordered Wang Jun and others to lead Jin forces on an invasion of Wu. The invasion turned out successful and led to the reunification of China under the Jin dynasty. When Emperor Wu assessed Xun Xu's contributions in helping him draft imperial edicts, he rewarded Xun Xu by enfeoffing one of his sons as a village marquis with 1,000 taxable households in his marquisate and awarding him 1,000 rolls of silk. The emperor also enfeoffed Xun Xu's grandson, Xun Xian (荀顯), as the Marquis of Yingyang Village (潁陽亭侯).

Around the time, there was much discussion in the imperial court over the issue of restoring the nobles to their fiefs and allowing them to govern from their respective fiefs. When Emperor Wu sought his opinion, Xun Xu disapproved because he believed that since the nobles also held gubernatorial appointments, they might neglect their original jurisdictions once they return to their respective fiefs. He also pointed out the possible complications such as having to subdivide the fiefs into commanderies and counties, as well as the risk of making people unhappy since the subdividing would require relocating residents from one area to another. He further pointed out that they would need to reassign troops from the borders and place them under decentralised command in the various fiefs. When Emperor Wu asked Xun Xu to reconsider his views, Xun Xu explained further that the best course of action was to maintain the status quo, since the redrawing of boundaries between the fiefs might lead to resentment and potential unrest if it was not carefully managed. He also pointed out that there were far more important issues that required immediate attention, so they should focus on those first. Emperor Wu thought that Xun Xu's advice was appropriate and heeded it.

Around the time, the imperial court was discussing a proposal to retrench about half the number of officials in commanderies and counties to free up labour for agricultural works. Xun Xu cited examples from the Han dynasty and gave a long explanation on why he believed that the best solution was to reduce the layers of bureaucracy in the administration. He pointed out how doing so could help to discourage officials from corrupt behaviour, improve administrative efficiency, and build up greater social trust among the masses. He often applied such critical analysis in assessing the costs and benefits of government policies.

In the Taikang era (280–289), Emperor Wu issued an imperial edict to praise Xun Xu for his talents and contributions, and said that he was capable of assuming greater responsibilities. He then appointed Xun Xu as a Household Counsellor (光祿大夫) to be treated like one of the Three Ducal Ministers, as well as allowing Xun Xu to have his own administrative office, in addition to his existing appointments as Supervisor of the Palace Writers (中書監) and Palace Attendant (侍中). Around the time, Jia Chong and Li Yin were already dead and the position of Crown Prince's Grand Tutor (太子太傅) was vacant. Xun Xu wrote a memorial to Emperor Wu, nominating Yang Yao to be the Crown Prince's Grand Tutor, and either Wei Guan or Shan Tao to be the new Minister over the Masses. Emperor Wu accepted his suggestions.

In the autumn of the following year, heavy flooding occurred in many commanderies, with Yan Province being the worst hit. Xun Xu wrote a memorial to Emperor Wu and suggested that he create the office of a dushui shizhe (都水使者; an official in charge of waterworks) to deal with floods in the future. Later, on a separate occasion, he appointed his subordinates Yin Xian (伊羨) and Zhao Xian (趙咸) as Members of the Retinue (舍人) and tasked them with drafting legislation. When Emperor Wu asked him why he did so, Xun Xu explained the importance of delegating responsibilities to subordinates. He also pointed out why he believed it was redundant to have officials focusing on drafting legislation only since their duties overlap with those of other officials, so it was better to delegate such additional responsibilities to the latter group.

Xun Xu was careful and cautious in his behaviour. Whenever policy changes were announced, if he played a role in lobbying for those changes, he would keep quiet about his involvement. Xun Liang (荀良), one of his younger relatives, advised him to let others know the good deeds he did so that he would gain greater respect. Wu Tong (武統), his son-in-law, also urged him to attract people to support him. However, Xun Xu refused to listen to them and he warned his sons against forming their own political clouts and forgetting their place as subjects of the emperor. Later, Emperor Wu promoted Xun Xu to be the Prefect of the Masters of Writing (尚書令).

Xun Xu served as the Supervisor of the Palace Writers for a long time and had access to state secrets. After he was reassigned to be the Prefect of the Masters of Writing, he felt dissatisfied and unhappy. When someone congratulated on his new appointment, he expressed his anger over losing his previous appointment. When he was serving as the Prefect of the Masters of Writing, he evaluated his subordinates based on their performance and dismissed those who failed to live up to his expectations. Emperor Wu once told Xun Xu that he hoped that Xun Xu would learn from Xun Yu and Xun You by promoting deserving officials and dismissing corrupt officials. A few months after Xun Xu assumed his new appointment, his mother died so he resigned and wanted to go home for filial mourning. However, Emperor Wu denied him permission and sent Zhou Hui (周恢) to announce an imperial edict ordering him to return to his job.

== Association with Jia Chong, Jia Nanfeng and Sima Zhong ==
When Emperor Wu wanted to reassign Jia Chong to guard the Guanzhong region, Xun Xu told his colleague Feng Dan that their status in the imperial court depended on Jia Chong's presence so they should try to stop the emperor from sending Jia Chong out of the imperial capital, Luoyang. Xun Xu thought of persuading Emperor Wu to arrange a marriage between Sima Zhong, the crown prince, and Jia Chong's daughter, Jia Nanfeng. In this way, Jia Chong, as the crown prince's father-in-law, would have to remain in Luoyang. Xun Xu and Feng Dan then sang praises of Jia Chong's daughter in front of Emperor Wu and managed to convince him to arrange the marriage. Many officials were disgusted by Xun Xu's fawning behaviour and called him a sycophant.

Emperor Wu knew that Sima Zhong had developmental disability so he became worried that his son would bring disaster upon the Jin dynasty. He ordered Xun Xu and He Jiao to observe and evaluate Sima Zhong. Xun Xu praised Sima Zhong for being a virtuous crown prince, while He Jiao said that Sima Zhong was the same as before. He Jiao became respected for being honest about Sima Zhong, whereas Xun Xu was derided for lying in order to please the emperor.

In another incident, when Emperor Wu wanted to depose Jia Nanfeng from the position of crown prince's consort, Xun Xu and Feng Dan immediately went to plead with the emperor to reconsider his decision and eventually succeeded in dissuading him from deposing Jia Nanfeng. Many people believed that Xun Xu could potentially bring about the Jin dynasty's downfall and compared him unfavourably to Sun Zi and Liu Fang, who were seen as having caused the downfall of Wei.

== Other contributions and anecdotes ==
Xun Xu was in charge of music arrangement. Some of the pieces he arranged became widespread. He once heard the sound of a cowbell ringing and thought of using cowbells as an instrument to fine tune musical pieces.

When Xun Xu was serving as mishujian (秘書監; a supervising secretary), Emperor Wu also tasked him and Zhang Hua with arranging the imperial library's collection into a catalogue like Liu Xiang's Bielu (別錄). When old bamboo scrolls were discovered in an ancient tomb in Ji Commandery (汲郡) in 279, Emperor Wu tasked Xun Xu with copying, organising and compiling them. Xun Xu did so and created a book, Zhongjing (中經), which was then added to the imperial library's collection.

Xun Xu set up a school for students to learn calligraphy in the styles of Zhong Yao and Hu Wujing.

In one instance, Xun Xu was dining beside Emperor Wu when he told everyone that the food they were eating was cooked with fire created from wood that has undergone much "hardship". Everyone did not believe him, so the emperor summoned the chef and asked him. The chef said that he used wood from the wheels of an old carriage to start the fire, hence Xun Xu was right. They were impressed with his intelligence.

== Death and appraisal ==
Xun Xu died in late 289 during the Taikang era (280–289) of Emperor Wu's reign. The emperor granted him the posthumous appointment of Minister over the Masses and the posthumous title "Marquis Cheng" (成侯), in addition to awarding his family some ceramics from the imperial palace's collection, a set of official robes, 500,000 coins and 100 rolls of silk. He also sent an Imperial Secretary (御史) as his personal representative to attend Xun Xu's funeral.

Xun Xu served in the privy council and was in charge of state secrets for a long time. He was not only a talented writer, but also a deep thinker who understood very well his place as a subject of his lord. He knew what his lord expected of him and adapted his behaviour accordingly to please his lord. That was why he managed to remain in Emperor Wu's favour and live a comfortable life until his death.

== Family ==
Xun Xu had ten sons. Among them, the notable ones were Xun Ji (荀輯), Xun Fan and Xun Zu. Xun Ji inherited his father's marquis title and served in the Jin government, with his highest appointment being Minister of the Guards (衛尉). He was honoured with the posthumous title "Marquis Jian" (簡侯) after his death. His son, Xun Jun (荀畯), succeeded him and was posthumously honoured as "Marquis Lie" (烈侯). As Xun Jun had no son to succeed him, his marquis title was passed on to his nephew, Xun Shi (荀識).

Xun Ji had another son, Xun Chuo (荀綽), whose courtesy name was Yanshu (彥舒). Xun Chuo was famous for his literary talent and wrote 15 chapters of the Later Book of Jin (晉後書). Towards the end of the Yongjia era (307–313) in Emperor Huai's reign, he served as an Assistant Palace Gentleman (從事中郎) to the Minister of Works. He was captured by Shi Le when the latter rebelled against the Jin dynasty and became Shi Le's military adviser.

Xun Xu had at least two daughters. One married Wu Tong (武統)., while the other was the mother of Emperor Min of Jin.

One of Xun Xu's grandsons, Xun Xian (荀顯), was enfeoffed by Emperor Wu as the Marquis of Yingyang Village (潁陽亭侯).

== See also ==
- Lists of people of the Three Kingdoms
- Jizhong discovery
