= Gaoyao, Shaanxi =

Gaoyao 高耀镇
- Town
- Location in China
- Coordinates: 33°57′27″N 110°31′44″E
- Country: People's Republic of China
- Province: Shaanxi
- Prefecture-level city: Shangluo
- County: Luonan County
- Time zone: UTC+8 (China Standard)

Gaoyao (Chinese: 高耀; pinyin: Gāoyào) is a town under the administration of Luonan County, Shaanxi, China. As of 2023, it administers Xiyuan Residential Community (西塬社区) and the following nine villages:

- Gaoyao Village
- Huixian Village (会仙村)
- Longhe Village (龙河村)
- Lilong Village (里龙村)
- Shuangguan Village (双关村)
- Xinglong Village (兴龙村)
- Yanghe Village (杨河村)
- Wangling Village (王岭村)
- Lancaohe Village (兰草河村)
