= G4013 Yangzhou–Yueqing Expressway =

Road in China

Yangzhou–Yueqing Expressway
- 扬州－乐清高速公路
- Yangyue Expressway 扬乐高速公路

Route information
- Auxiliary route of G40

Major junctions
- North end: G2 / G40 in Jiangdu, Yangzhou, Jiangsu
- South end: G15 / G1523 in Yueqing, Wenzhou, Zhejiang

Location
- Country: China

Highway system
- National Trunk Highway System; Primary; Auxiliary; National Highways; Transport in China
← G4012	→ G4015

The G4013 Yangzhou–Yueqing Expressway (Chinese: 扬州—乐清高速公路), commonly referred to as the Yangyue Expressway (Chinese: 扬乐高速公路), is an expressway in China that connects the cities of Yangzhou, Jiangsu and Yueqing, Zhejiang.

== Route ==
The expressway starts in Yangzhou and passes through Danyang, Jintan, Anji, Lin'an, Tonglu, Yiwu, Pan'an, Xianju, before terminating in Yueqing.
