= Guo Mo =

Jin dynasty general and warlord (died 330)

- 郭默

Administrator of Henei (河內太守)
- In office 310 – ?
- Monarchs: Emperor Huai of Jin/ Emperor Min of Jin/ Emperor Yuan of Jin

Inspector of Jiangzhou (江州刺史)
- In office 330 – 330
- Monarch: Emperor Cheng of Jin

Personal details
- Born: Unknown Wuzhi County, Jiaozuo, Henan
- Died: 330
- Spouse(s): Lady Lu; Two unnamed wives
- Relations: Guo Zhi (brother)
- Courtesy name: Xuanxiong (玄雄)

Guo Mo (died 21 June 330), courtesy name Xuanxiong, was a Chinese military general and warlord of the Jin dynasty (266–420). During the Disaster of Yongjia, he became a manor lord (塢主; wùzhǔ) before joining Li Ju against the Han-Zhao and Later Zhao states for control over the Luoyang region. As Li Ju faced defeat, Guo Mo abandoned him and fled south to Jiankang, the capital of the Eastern Jin, where he later sided with the imperial force during Su Jun's Rebellion. After his controversial killing of his contemporary, Liu Yin (劉胤 (Note: not to be confused with the Han-Zhao prince Liu Yin)) in 330, the ministers, Tao Kan and Yu Liang raised their troops against him and executed him.

== As a manor lord ==
=== Early years ===
Guo Mo was from Huai County in Henei Commandery. His family was described as humble and made a living of selling meat and wine for generations. Guo was said to have martial talents, being able to jump over a roughly 3 metres wide moat while wearing full armour. It was because of this that he earned a position under the Prefect of Henei, Pei Zheng (裴整), as a general. In 310, Pei Zheng was besieged and captured by Han-Zhao forces. Guo gathered Pei Zheng's remaining soldiers and established himself as a manor lord. The Inspector of Bingzhou, Liu Kun, commissioned him to take up Pei Zheng's position.

For the next few years, Guo amassed a fortune from robbing travellers fleeing east by boat who passed by his territory. This had little to no repercussions for Guo, however, as many refugees would rather join him than stay in Han-Zhao, even more after hearing about his wealth. Guo also treated his soldiers kindly, so they remained loyal to him. On one occasion, Guo Mo's wife's brother, Lu Jia (陸嘉), was stealing rice from the granaries and giving it to his sister. When Guo found out, he tried to execute Lu Jia, but Lu ran away to Han-Zhao. To show that he had no part in the act, Guo personally killed his own wife with a bow.

=== Conflict with Liu Yao ===
In 314, Han forces were trying to capture Chang'an. Their general, Liu Yao, was repelled, so Liu turnt to Guo Mo in Huai. Liu surrounded the city and fought till Guo had very little food left. As a compromise, Guo traded his wife and children as hostages in exchange for grain. Liu Yao saw this as a sign of submission, but after the exchange, Guo resumed his defence. Liu Yao was angered by this and had Guo's wife and children drowned in the Huai River. Guo considered abandoning the city as Liu Yao intensified his offence. He sent a letter to his neighbouring manor lord, Li Ju, asking if he could come over to his base in Xinzheng. Li Ju permitted and sent his nephew Guo Song (no family ties to Guo Mo) to escort him. However, Song was wary to approach as he did not have enough troops to face Liu Yao. Coincidentally, an army led by Liu Kun's general Zhang Zhao (張肇) happened to be returning from Chang'an. Li Ju asked Zhang for help, so Zhang sent his Xianbei cavalry to attack Liu Yao. The Han soldiers were startled by the reinforcements and retreated without a fight. Guo arrived at Xinzheng while Liu Yao fell back to Baoban.

== Service under Li Ju ==
In 317, Li Ju was attacked by the Han general Liu Chang (劉暢). Guo sent his younger brother, Guo Zhi (郭芝), to help him but by the time he arrived, Li had already routed the enemy. Nonetheless, Li ordered Guo Zhi to pursue the fleeing enemies during the night. Zhi did so and captured many soldiers before returning. Later that year, Guo raided Hedong Commandery with the former Han general Zhao Gu (趙固), who had surrendered Luoyang to Li Ju. The pair took in thousands of refugees in Sili, although a huge number were killed by pursuing Han forces. The following year, Guo Mo and Guo Song camped at Luorui (洛汭, in modern-day Luonan County, Shaanxi) to reinforce Zhao Gu.

In 320, the Han-Zhao commanders guarding Luoyang, Yin An (尹安), Song Shi (宋始), Song Shu (宋恕), and Zhao Shen (趙愼) all decided to surrender to Later Zhao (Note: Han-Zhao breakaway state formed by Shi Le in 319). Shi Le sent Shi Sheng to receive them, but the generals changed their minds and surrendered to Li Ju instead. Guo Mo quickly reinforced Luoyang, so Sheng only captured Song Shi's army before retreating north. The people of Henan fled to Li Ju, and Luoyang was practically emptied.

In 324, Shi Sheng attacked Guo Song but was defeated. In response, his brother Shi Cong led a surprise attack on Guo Mo. Guo was afraid when he realized he could not overcome Shi Cong and wanted to surrender to Liu Yao (Note: now Emperor of Han-Zhao). Guo sent Zheng Xiong (鄭雄) to discuss this idea with Li Ju, but Li sternly turned it down. Shi Sheng camped at Luoyang and plundered Henan, continuously defeating Li Ju and Guo Mo. As food supply in Li Ju's army were beginning to run low, Guo asked Li once more to align themselves with Liu Yao, and Li finally agreed. Liu Yao accepted their submission, but the reinforcements he sent led by Liu Yue (劉岳) were defeated by Shi Hu. Guo was once again routed by Shi Sheng, causing Guo to abandon his post and secretly make his escape to Jiankang. Li Ju eventually knew of Guo's desertion and became furious. Guo Song pursued him and managed to catch up with him at Xiangcheng. Desperate, Guo Mo left his wife and children before going on the run again.

== Su Jun's Rebellion ==
Guo Mo reached Jiankang while Li Ju later died in a horse accident while returning to the south. During his time in Jiankang, Guo became General Who Conquers the Caitiffs. In 326, he was further made General of the Household Gentlemen of the North, Chief of military affairs north of the Huai River, and acting commander of Liu Xia's forces. In 328, tension between the regent Yu Liang and the warlord Su Jun reached its tipping point. Yu Liang, fearful of Su Jun, recalled his generals back to Jiankang including Guo Mo to defend himself. When war broke out that same year, Guo Mo defended Jiankang but was defeated, and he followed Yu Liang and Liang's brothers Yu Shuyu, Yu Tiao and Yu Yi in fleeing to Xunyang.

Later that year, Yu Liang, Wen Jiao and Tao Kan formed a loyalist coalition to take back Jiankang and Emperor Cheng from Su Jun. The loyalist fought Su Jun at Shitou but could were locked in a stalemate. The eastern army under Xi Jian returned to Jingkou to set up defenses in Daye (大業, in present-day Suzhou, Jiangsu), Qu'a (曲阿縣; present-day Danyang, Jiangsu), and Chengting (庱亭, in present-day Wujin County, Jiangsu), and Guo was tasked in defending Daye. Su Jun forces led by Han Huang and Zhang Jian (張健) attacked Daye, and soon the water supply within the rampart was used up. Guo quietly fled from his post and left his soldiers to fend for themselves. Panic ensued in Jingkou as news of the situation in Daye reached Xi Jian's army. Regardless, Xi Jian insisted that everyone stood their ground, a decision that proved fruitful as the other loyalist forces were eventually able to defeat and kill Su Jun in battle. Su Jun's remaining forces were destroyed the following year.

== Downfall and death ==
=== Dispute with Liu Yin ===
Guo Mo did not appear to have faced punishment for his actions and resumed his role as a border commander. In January 330, Guo was summoned to the capital to become General of the Army of the Right. Guo had no interest in serving in the palace and was annoyed by this, so he vented his frustrations to the Inspector of Jiangzhou, Liu Yin. However, Liu told him he wanted nothing to do with the matter. When Guo was about to take up his new position, he asked Liu for assistance, but Liu once again snubbed him. Liu's advisors were also ill-judged towards Guo, so Guo's resentment for Liu grew. During a Laba Festival, Liu sent Guo a pig's head and a cup of wine, an insulting reference to his family background. Guo, angered, threw Liu's envoy into a nearby river.

Some time that month, a man named Gai Zhun (蓋肫) kidnapped someone's daughter and made her his concubine. Liu's Chief Clerk, Zhang Man (張滿), demanded him to return the daughter to her family, but Gai refused. Earlier, Liu Yin's misconducts warranted him a letter of removal from the court, which he purposefully ignored. Gai went to Guo Mo and told him about the letter. He convinced Guo Mo that Liu Yin was planning a rebellion, and the only person he feared and wanted to get rid of was Guo Mo.

Subsequently, Guo Mo led his men to the government center where Liu Yin was at. Officials who tried to stop Guo were threatened with clan extermination which Guo claimed was sanctioned by the court. Liu Yin was dragged out of the building and beheaded alongside his officials on 29 January 330. Guo Mo sent Liu Yin's head to the court and publicized a forged imperial decree to justify his actions. Guo Mo then took Liu Yin's daughter and concubines for himself while confiscating Liu Yin's property. Guo also tried to get the general Huan Xuan to join him, but Huan turned him down.

=== Death ===
In February 330, Liu Yin's head arrived in Jiankang. The Prime Minister Wang Dao felt that Guo was too strong to deal with; on 5 February, he hung the head on a ship and gave Guo Mo Liu's positions. Tao Kan, however, believed Guo must be punished and started raising his troops. Guo tried to appease Tao Kan by sending him gifts as well as the forged edict, but Tao Kan persisted. Soon, Wang decided to back Tao Kan, and Yu Liang would also lead his army against Guo. Guo marched to Yuzhang (豫章; around present-day Nanchang, Jiangxi) to occupy the commandery where he met with Tao Kan's army. Tao was victorious, so Guo withdrew into his part of the city. Yu Liang's army arrived at Penkou (湓口, in present-day Jiujiang, Jiangxi) and joined up with Tao Kan.

Tao still valued Guo's talents and wanted to capture him alive, so he sent Guo Song to get him to surrender. Guo Mo initially accepted it but began having second thoughts once he realized that Tao may kill his followers. After he took too long to come out, Tao Kan resumed his offense, this time even more fiercely. Guo was eventually betrayed by his subordinates and brought tied alongside his sons before Tao Kan. Guo was beheaded, and his head was sent to Jiankang. Those who were executed alongside him were forty of his partisans.
