= Zhashui County =

Zhashui County 柞水县
- County
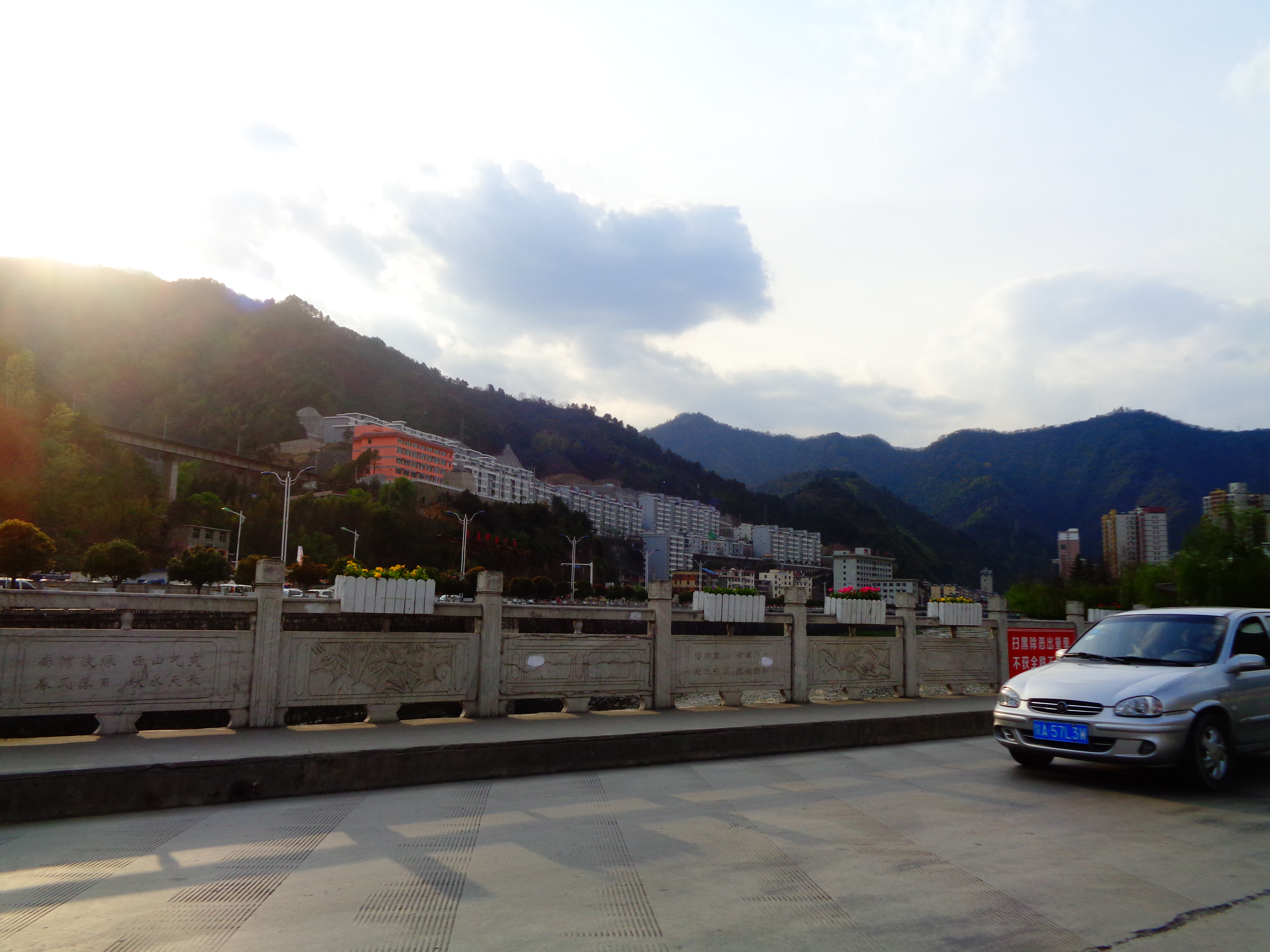

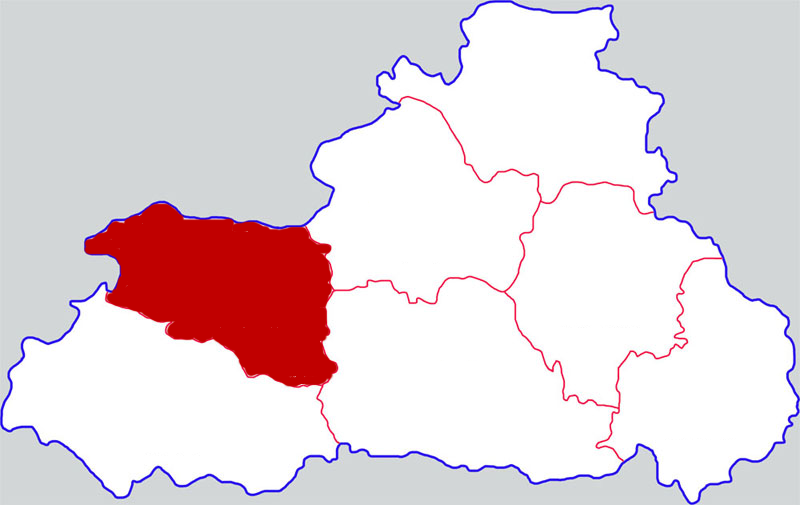
- Zhashui in Shangluo

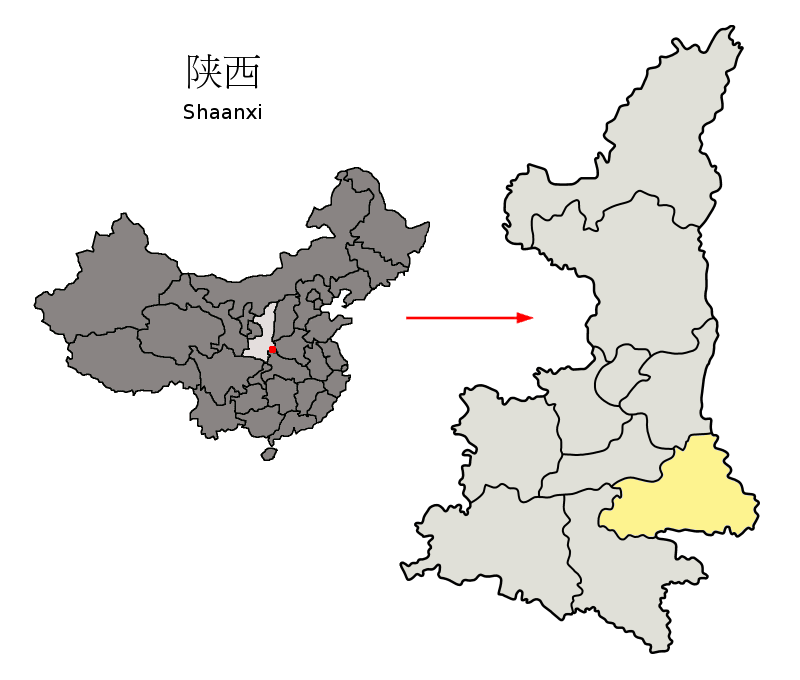
- Shangluo in Shaanxi
- Coordinates: 33°41′10″N 109°06′50″E
- Country: People's Republic of China
- Province: Shaanxi
- Prefecture-level city: Shangluo

Area
  - Total: 2,322 km^{2} (897 sq mi)

Population (2004)
  - Total: 160,000
  - Density: 69/km^{2} (180/sq mi)
- Time zone: UTC+8 (China Standard)
- Postal code: 711400
- Area code: 0914

Zhashui County (simplified Chinese: 柞水县; traditional Chinese: 柞水縣; pinyin: Zhàshuǐ Xiàn) is a county in the south-central part of Shaanxi province, China. It is under the administration of the prefecture-level city of Shangluo, and has an area of 2,322 km^{2} (897 sq mi) and a population of 160,000 as of 2004.

== Administrative divisions ==
As of 2020, Zhashui County has 1 subdistrict, 8 towns and 1 township under its administration.

1 subdistrict

- Qianyou (乾佑街道)

8 towns

- Xingping (杏坪镇)
- Caoping (曹坪镇)
- Hongyansi (红岩寺镇)
- Fenghuang (凤凰镇)
- Xiaoling (小岭镇)
- Xialiang (下梁镇)
- Yingpan (营盘镇)
- Wafangkou (瓦房口镇)

== Climate ==
Climate data for Zhashui, elevation 818 m (2,684 ft), (1991–2020 normals, extremes 1981–2010)
Month	Jan	Feb	Mar	Apr	May	Jun	Jul	Aug	Sep	Oct	Nov	Dec	Year
Record high °C (°F)	17.9 (64.2)	22.4 (72.3)	31.1 (88.0)	35.2 (95.4)	36.1 (97.0)	39.0 (102.2)	37.7 (99.9)	38.4 (101.1)	37.7 (99.9)	29.6 (85.3)	24.1 (75.4)	19.4 (66.9)	39.0 (102.2)
Mean daily maximum °C (°F)	7.4 (45.3)	10.4 (50.7)	15.7 (60.3)	21.9 (71.4)	25.1 (77.2)	28.6 (83.5)	30.3 (86.5)	29.1 (84.4)	23.9 (75.0)	18.9 (66.0)	13.9 (57.0)	8.9 (48.0)	19.5 (67.1)
Daily mean °C (°F)	0.2 (32.4)	3.4 (38.1)	8.2 (46.8)	13.8 (56.8)	17.3 (63.1)	21.2 (70.2)	23.6 (74.5)	22.6 (72.7)	17.9 (64.2)	12.4 (54.3)	6.7 (44.1)	1.6 (34.9)	12.4 (54.3)
Mean daily minimum °C (°F)	−4.8 (23.4)	−1.8 (28.8)	2.5 (36.5)	7.4 (45.3)	11.2 (52.2)	15.4 (59.7)	18.8 (65.8)	18.3 (64.9)	14.0 (57.2)	8.3 (46.9)	1.9 (35.4)	−3.4 (25.9)	7.3 (45.2)
Record low °C (°F)	−14.7 (5.5)	−12.2 (10.0)	−9.5 (14.9)	−4.4 (24.1)	0.8 (33.4)	7.2 (45.0)	10.9 (51.6)	9.4 (48.9)	1.5 (34.7)	−6.0 (21.2)	−9.9 (14.2)	−17.5 (0.5)	−17.5 (0.5)
Average precipitation mm (inches)	5.5 (0.22)	12.2 (0.48)	26.6 (1.05)	40.8 (1.61)	80.9 (3.19)	103.1 (4.06)	151.0 (5.94)	132.0 (5.20)	116.9 (4.60)	70.2 (2.76)	25.8 (1.02)	4.8 (0.19)	769.8 (30.32)
Average precipitation days (≥ 0.1 mm)	4.3	5.4	7.9	8.7	11.6	10.8	14.6	12.9	13.1	12.2	7.2	4.0	112.7
Average snowy days	5.7	4.3	2.0	0.2	0	0	0	0	0	0	1.5	3.0	16.7
Average relative humidity (%)	63	61	60	62	69	73	78	80	82	80	72	65	70
Mean monthly sunshine hours	144.2	127.4	158.5	177.7	185.1	187.8	195.3	179.5	124.2	122.1	132.8	148.1	1,882.7
Percentage possible sunshine	46	41	42	45	43	44	45	44	34	35	43	48	43
Source: China Meteorological Administration

== Transportation ==
Zhashui is served by the Xi'an–Ankang Railway.
