= Shanyang County =

Shanyang County 山阳县
- County
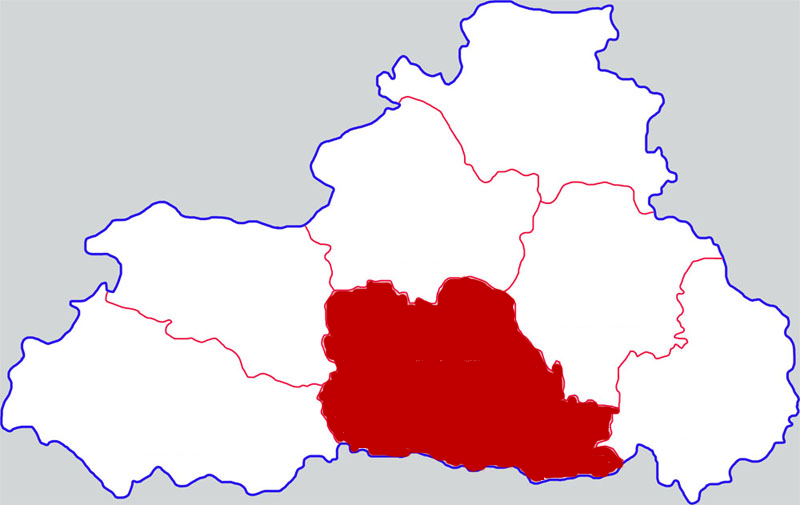
- Shanyang in Shangluo

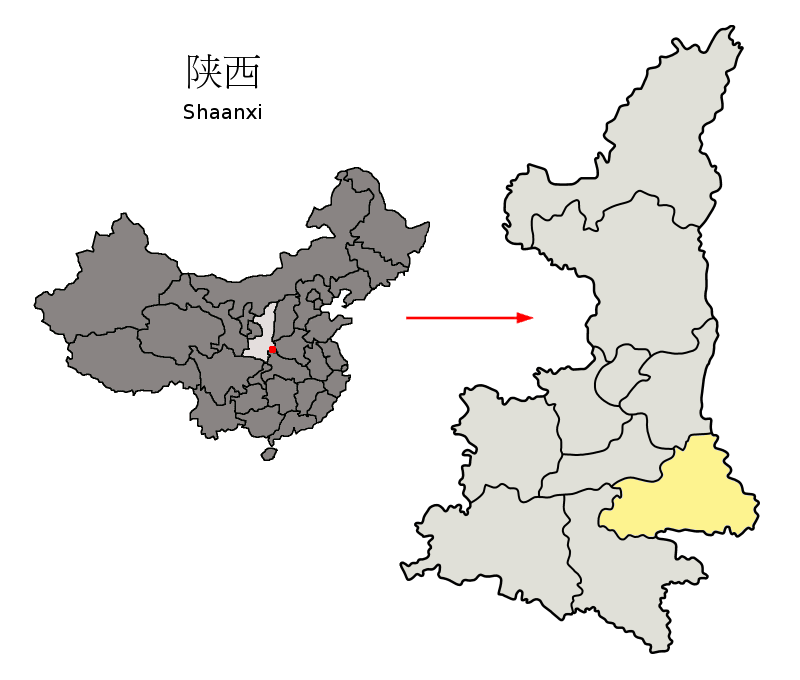
- Shangluo in Shaanxi
- Coordinates: 33°31′55″N 109°52′55″E
- Country: People's Republic of China
- Province: Shaanxi
- Prefecture-level city: Shangluo

Area
  - Total: 3,515 km^{2} (1,357 sq mi)

Population (2004)
  - Total: 440,000
  - Density: 130/km^{2} (320/sq mi)
- Time zone: UTC+8 (China Standard)
- Postal code: 726400
- Area code: 0914

Shanyang County (simplified Chinese: 山阳县; traditional Chinese: 山陽縣; pinyin: Shānyáng Xiàn) is a county in southeastern Shaanxi province, China, bordering Hubei province to the south. It is under the administration of the prefecture-level city of Shangluo and has an area of 3,515 km^{2} (1,357 sq mi) and a population of 440,000 as of 2004.

== Administrative divisions ==
Shanyang County has 2 subdistricts and 8 towns.

2 subdistricts

- Chengguan (城关街道)
- Shilipu (十里铺街道)

8 towns

- Banyan (板岩镇)
- Sehepu (色河铺镇)
- Xiaohekou (小河口镇)
- Yangdi (杨地镇)
- Nankuanping (南宽坪镇)
- Manchuanguan (漫川关镇)
- Xizhaochuan (西照川镇)
- Yinhua (银花镇)

== Climate ==
Climate data for Shanyang, elevation 660 m (2,170 ft), (1991–2020 normals, extremes 1981–2010)
Month	Jan	Feb	Mar	Apr	May	Jun	Jul	Aug	Sep	Oct	Nov	Dec	Year
Record high °C (°F)	19.9 (67.8)	23.0 (73.4)	31.9 (89.4)	36.4 (97.5)	37.0 (98.6)	40.0 (104.0)	38.7 (101.7)	38.6 (101.5)	38.9 (102.0)	31.7 (89.1)	26.9 (80.4)	21.7 (71.1)	40.0 (104.0)
Mean daily maximum °C (°F)	8.0 (46.4)	10.9 (51.6)	16.0 (60.8)	22.4 (72.3)	26.1 (79.0)	30.1 (86.2)	31.6 (88.9)	30.1 (86.2)	25.3 (77.5)	20.5 (68.9)	14.8 (58.6)	9.6 (49.3)	20.5 (68.8)
Daily mean °C (°F)	0.8 (33.4)	3.9 (39.0)	8.7 (47.7)	14.6 (58.3)	18.6 (65.5)	22.8 (73.0)	25.2 (77.4)	23.8 (74.8)	19.2 (66.6)	13.6 (56.5)	7.5 (45.5)	2.3 (36.1)	13.4 (56.2)
Mean daily minimum °C (°F)	−4.0 (24.8)	−0.9 (30.4)	3.2 (37.8)	8.4 (47.1)	12.7 (54.9)	17.1 (62.8)	20.6 (69.1)	19.6 (67.3)	15.2 (59.4)	9.3 (48.7)	2.9 (37.2)	−2.3 (27.9)	8.5 (47.3)
Record low °C (°F)	−12.3 (9.9)	−10.2 (13.6)	−7.7 (18.1)	−2.2 (28.0)	2.4 (36.3)	8.0 (46.4)	13.1 (55.6)	11.3 (52.3)	3.9 (39.0)	−4.1 (24.6)	−8.6 (16.5)	−16.4 (2.5)	−16.4 (2.5)
Average precipitation mm (inches)	5.2 (0.20)	11.7 (0.46)	29.3 (1.15)	43.9 (1.73)	70.6 (2.78)	78.7 (3.10)	146.3 (5.76)	120.3 (4.74)	104.0 (4.09)	61.1 (2.41)	26.2 (1.03)	6.7 (0.26)	704 (27.71)
Average precipitation days (≥ 0.1 mm)	4.3	5.5	8.3	8.7	10.6	10.5	13.4	12.3	11.7	10.6	7.3	4.4	107.6
Average snowy days	5.3	4.0	2.0	0.2	0	0	0	0	0	0	1.3	3.4	16.2
Average relative humidity (%)	63	63	63	64	69	71	77	80	82	80	75	66	71
Mean monthly sunshine hours	147.7	124.6	150.6	174.8	185.8	190.1	197.7	185.8	133.3	134.7	130.6	144.5	1,900.2
Percentage possible sunshine	47	40	40	45	43	44	45	45	36	39	42	47	43
Source: China Meteorological Administration
