= Yunxi County =

Yunxi County 郧西县 Yunsi
- County
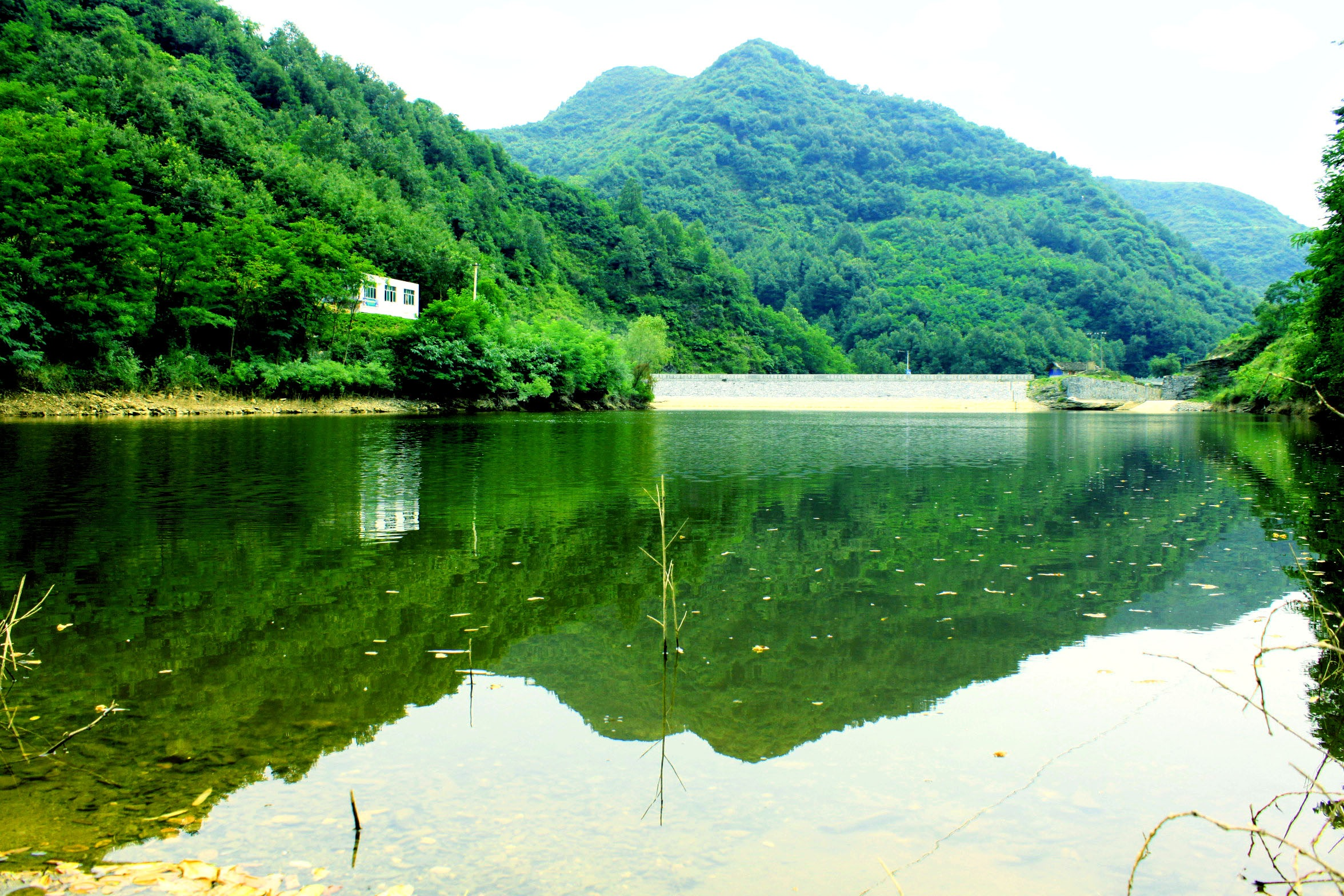
- Lujiagou Reservoir

- Location in Hubei
- Coordinates: 32°59′35″N 110°25′34″E
- Country: People's Republic of China
- Province: Hubei
- Prefecture-level city: Shiyan

Area
  - Total: 3,509 km^{2} (1,355 sq mi)

Population (2020)
  - Total: 371,012
  - Density: 105.7/km^{2} (273.8/sq mi)
- Time zone: UTC+8 (China Standard)
- Website: www.yunxi.gov.cn

Yunxi County (simplified Chinese: 郧西县; traditional Chinese: 鄖西縣; pinyin: Yúnxī Xiàn) is a county in the northwest of Hubei province, China, bordering Shaanxi province to the north and the west. It is under the administration of the prefecture-level city of Shiyan. The county spans a total area of 3,509.6 square kilometres (1,355.1 mi^{2}), and has a population of 371,012 as of 2010.

== History ==
During the Spring and Autumn period, the area of present-day Yunxi County belonged to the Jun State.

During the Warring States period, the area belonged to the Chu State.

The area belonged to the Hanzhong Commandery during the Qin Dynasty, which was later absorbed by the Han Dynasty.

During the Three Kingdoms period, the area was known as Pingyang County (simplified Chinese: 平阳县; traditional Chinese: 平陽縣; pinyin: Píngyáng Xiàn), and belonged to the Weixing Commandery of the Cao Wei.

Subsequently, Pingyang County was taken by the Jin Dynasty, and was renamed. The area was subsequently placed under the Shangjin Commandery.

The subsequent Song, Yuan, Ming, and Qing dynasties all reorganized the region. It was in 1476 that an administrative division known as Yunxi County came into being.

=== Republic of China ===
During the early years of the Republic of China, Yunxi County belonged to Xiangyang Circuit. In 1932, the Republic of China introduced Administrative Inspectorates, and Yunxi County fell under the 11th Administrative Inspectorate of Hubei Province. In 1936, it was moved to the 8th Administrative Inspectorate of Hubei Province.

=== People's Republic of China ===
On November 16, 1947, Yunxi County was taken by the People's Liberation Army, the first county in present-day Hubei that the army took.

In May 1949, the area was organized as part of the Liangyun Prefecture, which was then part of Shaanxi province. The following year, it was renamed to Yunyang Prefecture (simplified Chinese: 郧阳专区; traditional Chinese: 鄖陽專區), and moved to Hubei province. From 1952 to 1965, Yunyang Prefecture was abolished and merged into Xiangyang Prefecture, but was restored after this. In 1994, the reorganized Yunyang Prefecture fell under the jurisdiction of the prefecture-level city of Shiyan, which administers Yunxi County to this day.

== Geography ==
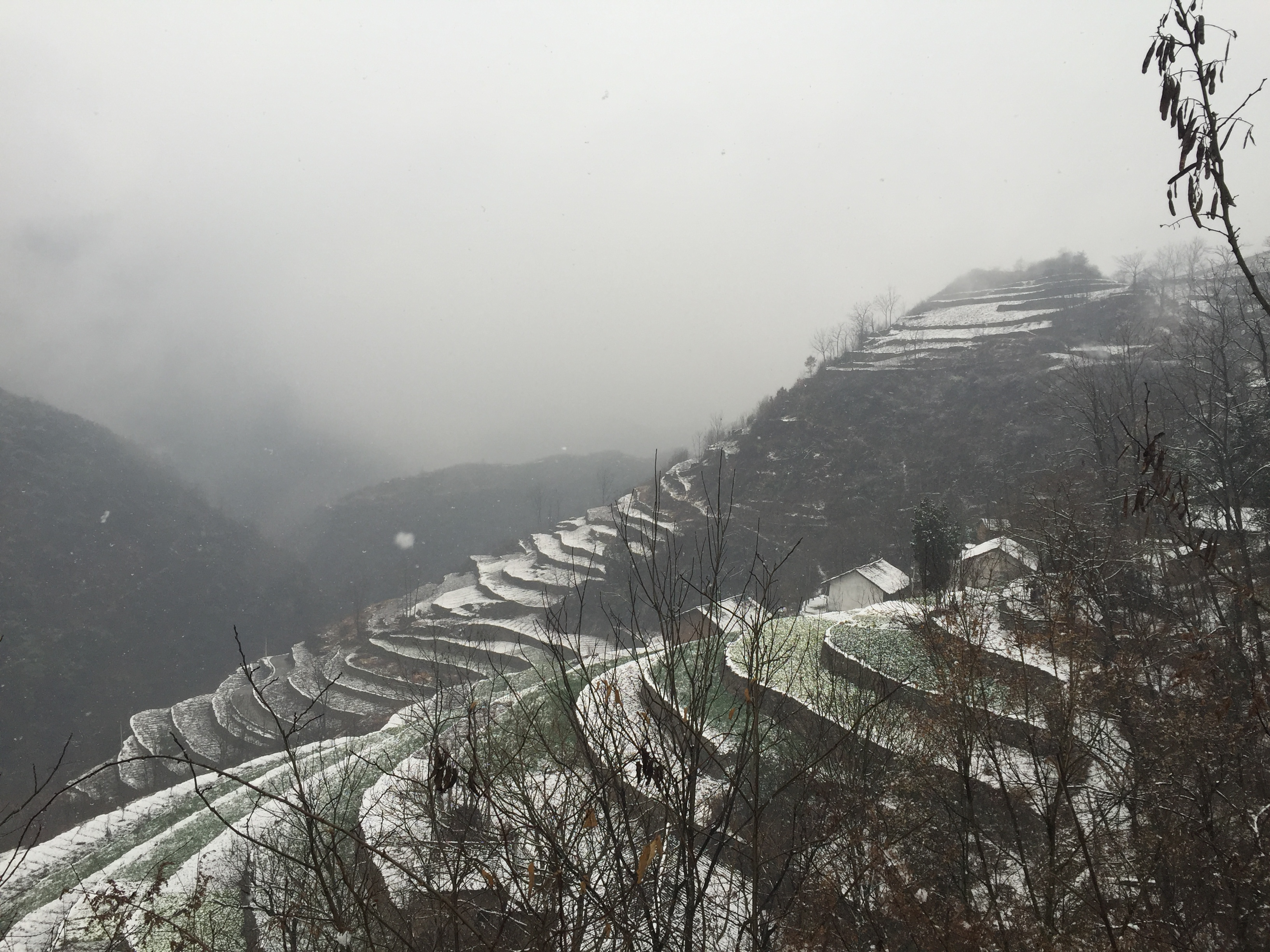
Terraces in Lujiagou Village in Liulang Township

The county's northwestern portion is relatively hilly, and borders the eastern section of the Qinling Mountains. Yunxi County has an average elevation of about 800 metres (2,600 ft). The county's highest point reaches 1,853 metres (6,079 ft) in elevation, whereas the lowest point is just 1.57 metres (5.2 ft) above sea level.

The Han River flows along the county's southern border, and a number of its tributaries flow through Yunxi County.

== Climate ==
Climate data for Yunxi, elevation 317 m (1,040 ft), (1991–2020 normals, extremes 1981–2010)
Month	Jan	Feb	Mar	Apr	May	Jun	Jul	Aug	Sep	Oct	Nov	Dec	Year
Record high °C (°F)	21.6 (70.9)	23.9 (75.0)	34.9 (94.8)	37.6 (99.7)	38.1 (100.6)	42.2 (108.0)	41.7 (107.1)	41.2 (106.2)	39.8 (103.6)	34.5 (94.1)	28.9 (84.0)	22.1 (71.8)	42.2 (108.0)
Mean daily maximum °C (°F)	9.0 (48.2)	12.0 (53.6)	17.4 (63.3)	23.8 (74.8)	27.9 (82.2)	31.5 (88.7)	33.2 (91.8)	31.9 (89.4)	27.0 (80.6)	21.9 (71.4)	16.2 (61.2)	10.8 (51.4)	21.9 (71.4)
Daily mean °C (°F)	2.7 (36.9)	5.5 (41.9)	10.5 (50.9)	16.4 (61.5)	21.1 (70.0)	25.2 (77.4)	27.4 (81.3)	26.2 (79.2)	21.4 (70.5)	15.8 (60.4)	9.7 (49.5)	4.3 (39.7)	15.5 (59.9)
Mean daily minimum °C (°F)	−1.4 (29.5)	1.1 (34.0)	5.5 (41.9)	10.8 (51.4)	15.6 (60.1)	20.1 (68.2)	23.3 (73.9)	22.3 (72.1)	17.6 (63.7)	11.9 (53.4)	5.5 (41.9)	0.2 (32.4)	11.0 (51.9)
Record low °C (°F)	−9.0 (15.8)	−7.5 (18.5)	−4.7 (23.5)	−0.4 (31.3)	5.3 (41.5)	12.2 (54.0)	15.0 (59.0)	15.2 (59.4)	7.3 (45.1)	−1.6 (29.1)	−4.4 (24.1)	−15.6 (3.9)	−15.6 (3.9)
Average precipitation mm (inches)	13.3 (0.52)	14.7 (0.58)	36.3 (1.43)	53.8 (2.12)	79.0 (3.11)	101.1 (3.98)	146.6 (5.77)	122.6 (4.83)	105.5 (4.15)	68.8 (2.71)	29.8 (1.17)	9.9 (0.39)	781.4 (30.76)
Average precipitation days (≥ 0.1 mm)	5.3	6.0	8.5	9.2	10.6	10.4	12.7	11.9	12.1	10.7	7.3	5.0	109.7
Average snowy days	4.2	3.2	1.1	0	0	0	0	0	0	0	0.7	1.7	10.9
Average relative humidity (%)	70	68	67	68	69	71	77	78	80	80	78	72	73
Mean monthly sunshine hours	131.0	123.4	157.6	187.2	202.9	201.7	218.5	202.2	149.5	143.8	134.6	139.3	1,991.7
Percentage possible sunshine	41	39	42	48	47	47	50	49	41	41	43	45	44
Source: China Meteorological Administration

== Administrative Divisions ==
Yunxi County administers nine towns, six townships, one ethnic township, and three other township-level divisions. These township-level divisions are then further divided into 348 village-level divisions.

=== Towns ===
Yunxi County's nine towns are Chengguan, Tumen, Shangjin, Dianzi, Jiahe, Yangwei, Guanyin, Ma'an, and Hejia.

=== Townships ===
Yunxi County's six townships are Xiangkou Township, Guanfang Township, Jingyang Township, Liulang Township, Jianchi Township, and Anjia Township.

=== Hubei Hui Ethnic Township ===
Yunxi County's sole ethnic township is Hubeikou Hui Ethnic Township.

=== Other township-level divisions ===
Yunxi County's also administers three other township level divisions: Huaishulin Special Field, Sanguandong Protected Natural Forest Area, and Yunxi County Industrial Park.

== Economy ==
=== Agriculture ===
The county maintains a significant agricultural sector, with notable products from the region including grapes and goats.

=== Electricity ===
As of 2020, the county is building a hydropower station, and has stated an intention to utilize the county's solar power and wind power potential.

=== Industry ===
The Yunxi County Industrial Park spans an area of 2,200 mu. Major industries in the county include auto parts and agricultural equipment.

=== Tourism ===
Yunxi County hosts four AAAA-level tourist attractions.

== Transportation ==
National Highway 209 runs through the county.
