= Xinmi =

Xinmi 新密市
- County-level city
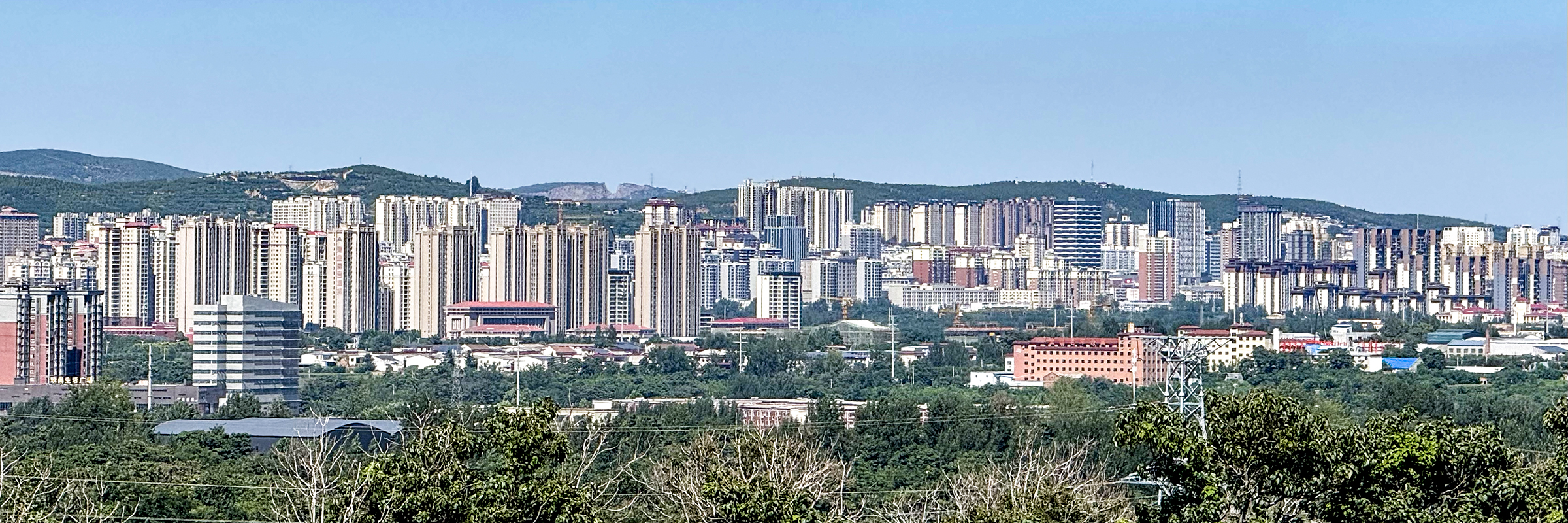

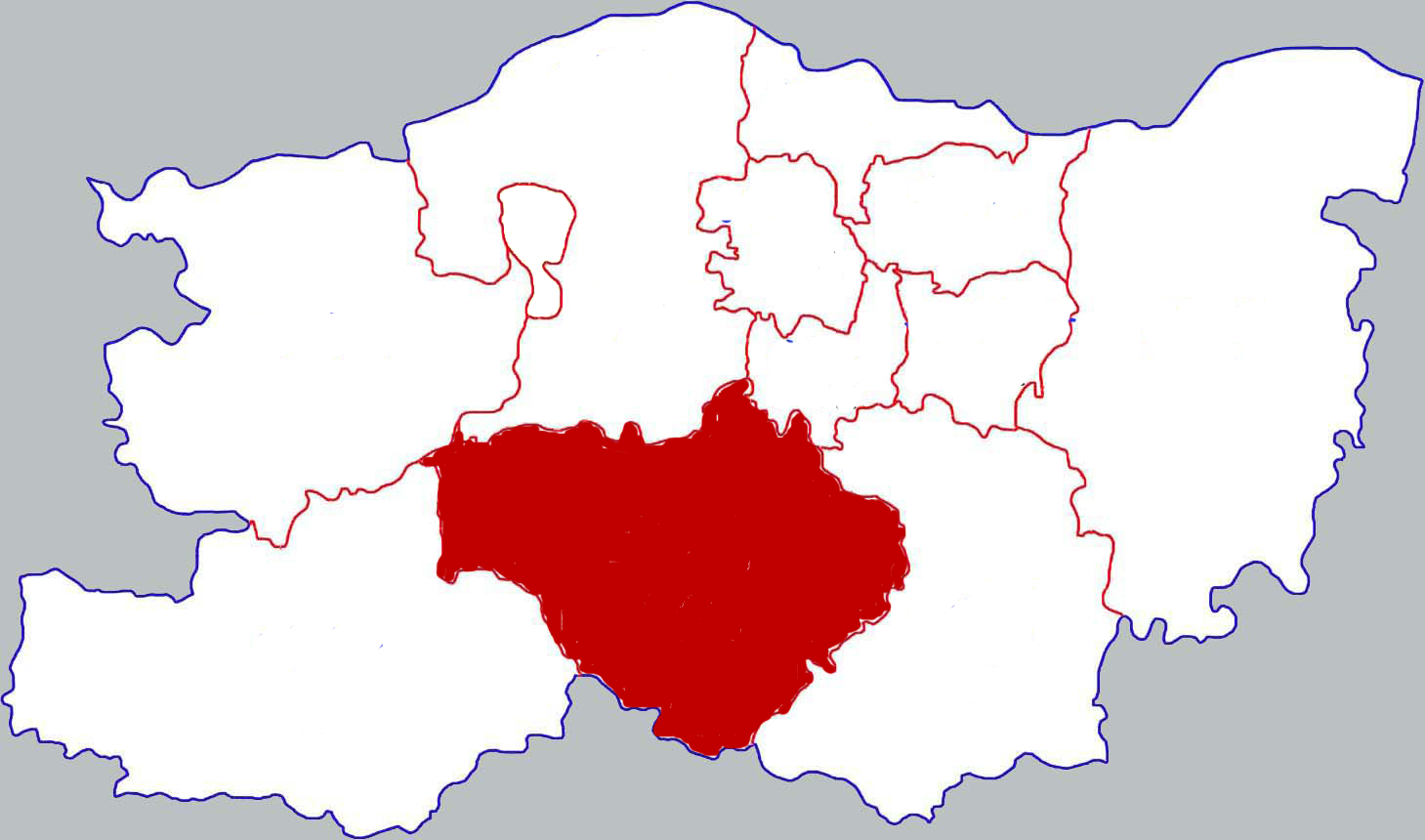
- Location in Zhengzhou

- Location in Henan
- Coordinates: 34°32′20″N 113°23′28″E
- Country: People's Republic of China
- Province: Henan
- Prefecture-level city: Zhengzhou

Area
  - Total: 1,001 km^{2} (386 sq mi)

Population (2019)
  - Total: 817,000
  - Density: 816/km^{2} (2,110/sq mi)
- Time zone: UTC+8 (China Standard)
- Postal code: 452300
- Website: www.xinmi.gov.cn

Xinmi (Chinese: 新密; pinyin: Xīnmì), formerly Mi County (simplified Chinese: 密县; traditional Chinese: 密縣; pinyin: Mì Xiàn), is a county-level city of Henan Province, South Central China, under the administration of the prefecture-level city of Zhengzhou.

The archaeological Bronze Age site Xinzhai was found 1979 about 20 km (12 mi) southeast of Xinmi.

== Administrative divisions ==
As of 2012, the city is divided to 4 subdistricts, 11 towns, 2 townships and 1 other.

Subdistricts

- Qingpinjie Subdistrict (青屏街街道)
- Xinhualu Subdistrict (新华路街道)
- Xidajie Subdistrict (西大街街道)
- Kuangqu Subdistrict (矿区街道)

Towns

- Chengguan (城关镇)
- Niudian (牛店镇)
- Pingmo (平陌镇)
- Chaohua (超化镇)
- Goutang (苟堂镇)
- Dawei (大隗镇)
- Liuzhai (刘寨镇)
- Baizhai (白寨镇)
- Yuecun (岳村镇)
- Laiji (来集镇)
- Micun (米村镇)

Townships

- Yuanzhuang Township (袁庄乡)
- Quliang Township (曲梁乡)

Others

- Jianshan Scenic Area (尖山风景区)

== Climate ==
Climate data for Xinmi, elevation 260 m (850 ft), (1991–2020 normals, extremes 1981–2010)
| Month | Jan | Feb | Mar | Apr | May | Jun | Jul | Aug | Sep | Oct | Nov | Dec | Year |
|---|---|---|---|---|---|---|---|---|---|---|---|---|---|
| Record high °C (°F) | 21.0 (69.8) | 25.1 (77.2) | 32.5 (90.5) | 37.9 (100.2) | 39.3 (102.7) | 41.5 (106.7) | 40.7 (105.3) | 38.6 (101.5) | 37.4 (99.3) | 34.2 (93.6) | 28.7 (83.7) | 22.9 (73.2) | 41.5 (106.7) |
| Mean daily maximum °C (°F) | 6.2 (43.2) | 9.3 (48.7) | 16.4 (61.5) | 22.4 (72.3) | 27.9 (82.2) | 31.5 (88.7) | 32.5 (90.5) | 30.8 (87.4) | 26.4 (79.5) | 21.2 (70.2) | 14.3 (57.7) | 8.7 (47.7) | 20.6 (69.1) |
| Daily mean °C (°F) | 0.9 (33.6) | 3.7 (38.7) | 10.5 (50.9) | 16.2 (61.2) | 22.1 (71.8) | 25.9 (78.6) | 27.5 (81.5) | 25.9 (78.6) | 21.1 (70.0) | 15.3 (59.5) | 8.9 (48.0) | 3.2 (37.8) | 15.1 (59.2) |
| Mean daily minimum °C (°F) | −3.1 (26.4) | −0.6 (30.9) | 5.3 (41.5) | 10.5 (50.9) | 16.2 (61.2) | 20.6 (69.1) | 23.3 (73.9) | 22.1 (71.8) | 16.9 (62.4) | 10.8 (51.4) | 4.6 (40.3) | −1.1 (30.0) | 10.5 (50.8) |
| Record low °C (°F) | −12.4 (9.7) | −11.3 (11.7) | −6.2 (20.8) | −1.4 (29.5) | 6.5 (43.7) | 11.8 (53.2) | 15.9 (60.6) | 12.2 (54.0) | 7.4 (45.3) | 1.4 (34.5) | −7.2 (19.0) | −10.3 (13.5) | −12.4 (9.7) |
| Average precipitation mm (inches) | 9.6 (0.38) | 12.6 (0.50) | 20.3 (0.80) | 37.5 (1.48) | 55.3 (2.18) | 66.9 (2.63) | 151.9 (5.98) | 126.4 (4.98) | 78.5 (3.09) | 40.0 (1.57) | 26.5 (1.04) | 7.8 (0.31) | 633.3 (24.94) |
| Average precipitation days (≥ 0.1 mm) | 4.4 | 4.5 | 5.9 | 6.3 | 7.3 | 8.3 | 11.7 | 11.3 | 9.0 | 6.7 | 5.6 | 3.9 | 84.9 |
| Average snowy days | 4.8 | 3.7 | 1.9 | 0.3 | 0 | 0 | 0 | 0 | 0 | 0 | 1.5 | 3.2 | 15.4 |
| Average relative humidity (%) | 53 | 54 | 53 | 55 | 55 | 58 | 73 | 75 | 70 | 62 | 59 | 53 | 60 |
| Mean monthly sunshine hours | 130.3 | 129.6 | 166.0 | 198.5 | 221.1 | 204.8 | 179.6 | 175.0 | 148.6 | 149.5 | 140.4 | 140.3 | 1,983.7 |
| Percentage possible sunshine | 41 | 42 | 45 | 51 | 51 | 47 | 41 | 43 | 40 | 43 | 46 | 46 | 45 |
Source: China Meteorological Administration
