= Luonan County =

Luonan County 洛南县 Lonan 雒南縣
- County
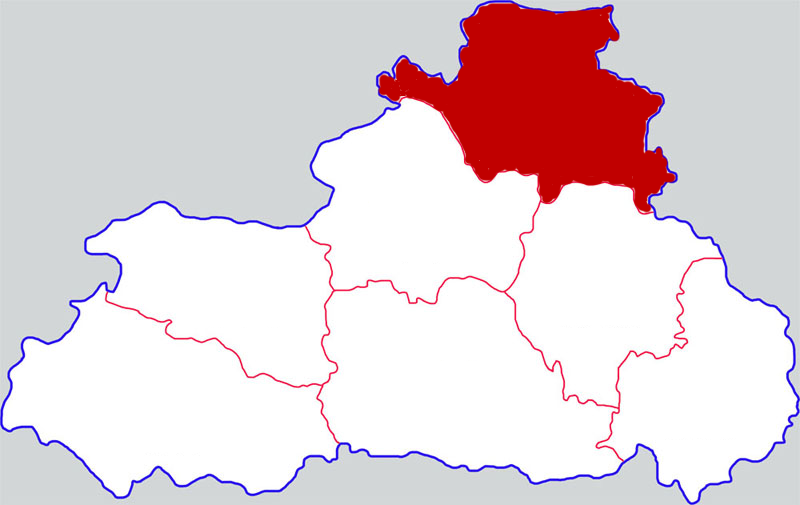
- Coordinates (Luonan County government): 34°05′27″N 110°08′55″E
- Country: People's Republic of China
- Province: Shaanxi
- Prefecture-level city: Shangluo

Area
  - Total: 2,562 km^{2} (989 sq mi)
- Elevation: 1,000 m (3,300 ft)

Population (2020)
  - Total: 460,000
  - Density: 180/km^{2} (470/sq mi)
- Time zone: UTC+8 (China Standard)
- Postal code: 726100
- Area code: 0914

Luonan County (traditional Chinese: 洛南縣; simplified Chinese: 洛南县; pinyin: Luònán Xiàn, alternatively 雒南縣) is a county under the administration of Shangluo city, in the east of Shaanxi province, China, bordering Henan province to the east. It has an area of 2,562 km^{2} (989 sq mi) and a population of 450,000 as of 2004. Luonan is at the source of the Luo River. It is 108 kilometers away from Xi'an, the capital of Shaanxi province. Luonan has 14 towns. Its walnut production ranks first in China. Its gold production ranks third in Shaanxi. Its average temperature is 11.1 °C (52.0 °F). More than 66.7% of Luonan is covered in forests.

== Name ==
The name Luonan means "south of Luo", referencing the Luo River. It went through many name changes until the final one under the Emperor Tianqi.

== Administrative divisions ==
Luonan County has 1 subdistrict and 9 towns.

1 subdistrict

- Chengguan (城关街道)

9 towns

- Maping (麻坪镇)
- Shimen (石门镇)
- Shipo (石坡镇)
- Xunjian (巡检镇)
- Si′er (寺耳镇)
- Lingkou (灵口镇)
- Sanyao (三要镇)
- Gucheng (古城镇)
- Jingcun (景村镇)

== Culture ==
Luonan tofu (洛南豆腐), a regional variant of tofu, is made from the pollution-free spring water of the Luo River and high-quality soybeans, resulting in its signature firmness and smoothness. It was once selected by Emperor Qianlong of the Qing Dynasty as a royal tribute.

== Transportation ==
China National Highway 344 passes through Luonan County.

== Climate ==
Climate data for Luonan, elevation 963 m (3,159 ft), (1991–2020 normals, extremes 1981–2010)
Month	Jan	Feb	Mar	Apr	May	Jun	Jul	Aug	Sep	Oct	Nov	Dec	Year
Record high °C (°F)	18.6 (65.5)	21.0 (69.8)	30.3 (86.5)	34.1 (93.4)	34.0 (93.2)	38.6 (101.5)	36.2 (97.2)	35.4 (95.7)	36.7 (98.1)	29.5 (85.1)	24.7 (76.5)	19.3 (66.7)	38.6 (101.5)
Mean daily maximum °C (°F)	5.1 (41.2)	8.4 (47.1)	13.8 (56.8)	20.3 (68.5)	24.1 (75.4)	27.8 (82.0)	29.3 (84.7)	27.9 (82.2)	23.1 (73.6)	18.1 (64.6)	12.3 (54.1)	6.8 (44.2)	18.1 (64.5)
Daily mean °C (°F)	−1.7 (28.9)	1.7 (35.1)	6.7 (44.1)	12.8 (55.0)	17.0 (62.6)	21.1 (70.0)	23.4 (74.1)	22.1 (71.8)	17.2 (63.0)	11.6 (52.9)	5.5 (41.9)	0.0 (32.0)	11.5 (52.6)
Mean daily minimum °C (°F)	−6.3 (20.7)	−3.1 (26.4)	1.3 (34.3)	6.6 (43.9)	10.8 (51.4)	15.2 (59.4)	18.7 (65.7)	17.8 (64.0)	13.0 (55.4)	7.1 (44.8)	0.9 (33.6)	−4.5 (23.9)	6.5 (43.6)
Record low °C (°F)	−18.6 (−1.5)	−13.9 (7.0)	−11.4 (11.5)	−5.4 (22.3)	−1.0 (30.2)	6.6 (43.9)	11.0 (51.8)	9.8 (49.6)	1.0 (33.8)	−6.0 (21.2)	−13.3 (8.1)	−22.6 (−8.7)	−22.6 (−8.7)
Average precipitation mm (inches)	9.7 (0.38)	14.5 (0.57)	28.3 (1.11)	42.8 (1.69)	72.5 (2.85)	85.7 (3.37)	127.3 (5.01)	101.5 (4.00)	110.3 (4.34)	61.5 (2.42)	27.4 (1.08)	7.2 (0.28)	688.7 (27.1)
Average precipitation days (≥ 0.1 mm)	5.5	6.6	7.6	8.8	10.8	10.5	13.4	11.6	12.4	11.2	7.4	4.2	110
Average snowy days	7.0	6.6	3.4	0.3	0	0	0	0	0	0.1	2.7	4.6	24.7
Average relative humidity (%)	63	64	61	61	66	70	77	80	81	77	71	63	70
Mean monthly sunshine hours	156.2	137.7	167.8	195.9	205.9	197.0	195.5	178.7	138.4	143.4	141.4	158.5	2,016.4
Percentage possible sunshine	49	44	45	50	48	46	45	43	38	41	46	52	46
Source: China Meteorological Administration
