= Cold-Food Powder =

Poisonous psychoactive drug

Cold-Food Powder (Chinese: 寒食散; pinyin: hánshísǎn; Wade–Giles: han-shih-san), also known as Five Minerals Powder(Chinese: 五石散; pinyin: wǔshísǎn; Wade–Giles: wu-shih-san), was a poisonous psychoactive drug popular in China from the Six Dynasties (220–589) to the Tang dynasty (618–907). Its ingredients typically included five minerals such as fluorite, quartz, and sulphur, often combined with highly toxic substances containing arsenic and mercury. Because it supposedly induced intense hyperthermia, users were required to ingest cold foods, bathe in cold water, and undertake xingsan (行散)—a practice of walking to circulate the powder—giving rise to the name "Cold-Food Powder."

Originally a Han dynasty medicinal formula, it became fashionable among the upper gentry after the Cao Wei scholar He Yan claimed it made his "spirit and intelligence receptive and lucid." The drug became a signature of the unconventional ming shi (名士) lifestyle and influenced contemporary fashion, encouraging loose robes and clogs. Due to its severe toxicity, long-term use could lead to disability or death; its popularity declined after the Tang, and by the Song dynasty its name was largely abandoned, though similar mineral-based remedies persisted under other names.

== Terminology ==
Both Chinese names hánshísǎn and wǔshísǎn have the suffix -sǎn (散; 'fall apart', 'scattered'), which means "medicine in powdered form" in Traditional Chinese medicine. Wǔshí (lit. "five rocks") refers to the component mineral drugs, typically fluorite, quartz, red bole clay, stalactite, and sulfur. Hánshí (lit. "cold food") refers to eating cold foods and bathing in cold water to counteract the drug-induced hyperthermia produced by the pyretic powder. Hanshi can also refer to the traditional Chinese holiday Hanshi jie (寒食節; "Cold Food Festival"), three days in early April when lighting a fire is prohibited and only cold foods are eaten.

Xingsan ('walk powder'), meaning "walking after having taken a powder" (compare walk off), was a therapeutic practice believed to circulate poisonous inorganic drug throughout the body, thus enhancing the psychoactive effects and preventing side effects. Mather claims the practice of xingsan "to walk a powder" was adopted from Xian Daoism, the "Immortality Cult" of the late Han period.

Although some authors transliterate the Chinese terms 五石散 and 寒食散 (e.g., han-shih san), many translate them. Compare these renderings of wushisan and/or hanshisan:

- powder of the five minerals & swallowed-cold powder
- five-mineral powder & cold-food powder
- Five-Stone Powder & Eat-Cold Powder
- Five-mineral-powder
- Five minerals powder & Powder to take with cold food
- Cold Food powder
- five-mineral-powder
- cold eating powder
- Cold Food Powder
- Five Minerals Powder & Cold-Food Powder
- Cold-Food Powder

Minor differences in capitalization and hyphenation generally account for these English variants.

== History ==
Five Minerals Powder was used medicinally in the 2nd century BCE, became a popular recreational entheogen and stimulant, known as Cold-Food Powder, among prominent counterculture literati during the 3rd century, and was deemed immoral and condemned after the 10th century.

=== Han dynasty ===
Texts from the Han dynasty (206 BCE–220 CE) refer to using the Wushi Five Minerals to cure fevers and to prolong life.

The (109–91 BCE) Shiji biography of the physician Chunyu Yi (淳于意, c. 216–147 BCE) contains the earliest Five Minerals reference. This history includes 25 case reports by Chunyu, including one in which he treated a Dr. Sui (遂) for poisoning around 160 BCE.

Sui, the Physician-in-waiting to the Prince of [Qi], fell ill. He had himself made preparations of the Five Minerals and had consumed them [自練五石服之]. Your servant therefore went to visit him, and he said 'I am unworthy and have some disease; would you be so kind as to examine me?' So I did, and then addressed him in these terms: 'Your malady is a fever [中熱]. The Discussions say that when there is a central fever along with obstipation and suppression of urine one must not ingest the Five Minerals. Mineral substances considered as drugs are fierce and potent, and it is because of having taken them that you have several times failed to evacuate. They ought not to be hastily taken. Judging by the colour, an abscess is forming.' ... I warned him that after a hundred days or more an abscess would gather above the pectoral region, that it would penetrate (the flesh by) the collar-bone, and that he would die. (扁鵲倉公列傳)

Needham describes this pharmaceutical use of the Five Minerals "the first well-documented evidence of the taking of inorganic substances" in China.

The (c. 1st century BCE) Liexian Zhuan biography of the legendary Zhou dynasty (c. 1046–256 BCE) Daoist xian "immortal" or "transcendent" Qiong Shu (邛疏) mentions the Five Minerals. It says Qiong, roasted and ate stalactites (石髓), which he called Shizhongru (石鐘乳; 'stone bell milk'; "stalactite"). He also slept on a stone bed and lived for several hundred years on Mount Song. Qiong obtained the Eight Delicious Foods and Five Minerals, which all provide longevity, and refined their essences into dumplings. A person can thus live to be one hundred, have a light body, sleep among mountain peaks, and wander with the Daoist immortals.

The Han scholar and alchemist Zheng Xuan (127–200) specified that to make hanshisan, the medically active minerals chalcanthite (shidan), cinnabar (dansha, red mercury sulphide), realgar (the arsenic sulphide xionghuang or xiongshi) and magnetite (cishi) should be enclosed in an earthen receptacle, continuously heated over three days. The drug obtained from the concoction could then be applied to the affected areas of the sick body.

The Han pharmacologist and physician Zhang Zhongjing includes two similar prescriptions in Jingui Yaolüe: hóushì hēi sǎn (侯氏黑散; "Hou's black powder") (also known as cǎofāng (草方; "herbal formula")) and zǐ shí hánshí sǎn ("purple stone cold-food powder") (also shífāng (石方; "mineral formula")). Huangfu Mi and other traditional Chinese medicine practitioners trace the wushisan to Zhang's work. This book remains a fundamental text in traditional Chinese medicine.

=== Six Dynasties ===
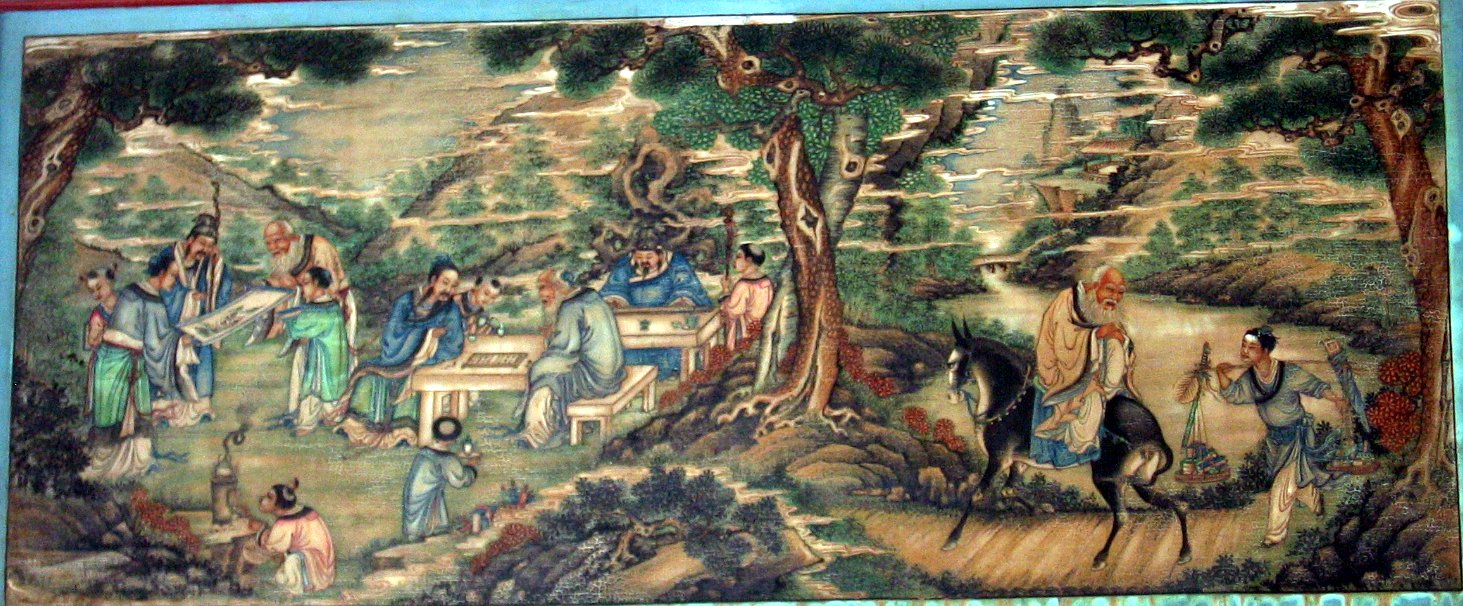
The Seven Sages of the Bamboo Grove, reputed connoisseurs of the cold food powder, as depicted in the Long Corridor of the Beijing Summer Palace.

The historical term "Six Dynasties" collectively refers to the Three Kingdoms (220–280), Jin dynasty (266–420), and Southern and Northern Dynasties (420–589). Sources from this period of disunity after the fall of the Han describe both medicinal and recreational uses of Five Mineral Powder or Cold Food Powder.

The Three Kingdoms scholar and doctor Huangfu Mi (215–282) took this "ecstasy-inducing drug" to recover from a stroke, but suffered and likely died from the deleterious side effects. His Lun Hanshisan fang (論寒食散方; "On the Recipe for Cold-Food Powder") (Note: Cao Xi wrote another book with the same title) records his disastrous self-medication that resulted in "pain and a general numbness and weakness of the body". Huangfu said, "The longest one can hope to live when taking the drug is ten years or so; for some, it is only five or six. Even though I myself can still see and breathe, my words resemble the loud laugh of someone who is presently drowning."

The Book of Jin says that Huangfu Mi used hanshisan poisoning as an excuse to decline a position offered by Emperor Wu (r. 265–290). The Cold Food Powder "disagreed with his nature and each time he was convulsed with excruciating pain. Once in a rage of suffering he prayed for a sword with which to kill himself, but his aunt remonstrated with him and made him stop." Huangfu said that the vogue for consuming Cold-Food Powder began with the Cao Wei state (220–265) scholar and politician He Yan (c. 195–249), who used the drug to achieve greater spiritual clarity and physical strength. He Yan and his friend Wang Bi (226–249), co-founders of the Daoist Xuanxue School, propagated the consumption of the drug in their philosophical circles. The French sinologist Paul Demiéville's described He Yan: "He was reckoned a paragon of beauty, elegance, and refinement, a floating flower (fou-hua) as his enemies used to say, or a dandy. He "loved Lao-Huang" and shone in "pure conversation." His lack of constraint brought down on him the ill-will of the orthodox traditionalists. He is even said to have brought into fashion a drug that brought on a state of ecstasy, and many of his friends and epigones were drug addicts."

Many other famous literati, such as the Seven Sages of the Bamboo Grove, especially the musician Ruan Ji (210–263), the alchemist Ji Kang (223–262), and the calligrapher Wang Xizhi (c. 303–361), reportedly were enthusiastic users of the drug. "Like an indulgent lifestyle of alcoholic excesses, the use of this drug became the hallmark of the free thinkers of the age". Livia Kohn describes Ruan Ji's artistic expression,

His friends and fellow poets induced ecstatic experiences through music, wine, and drugs, especially the notorious Cold Food Powder which created psychedelic states and made the body feel very hot, causing people to take off their clothes and jump into pools. When back in their ordinary selves, they wrote poetry of freedom and escape, applying the Zhuangzi concept of free and easy wandering in the sense of getting away from it all and continuing the text's tradition in their desperate search for a better world within.

The extant calligraphic writings attributed to Wang Xizhi mention taking hanshisan, for instance, two letters to his friend Zhou Fu (周撫, d. 365), Regional Inspector of Yizhou prefecture. A thank-you note requests Zhou to send rongyan (戎鹽; "rock salt"), "Turkestan salt is another thing I require. I need it when I take Cold-Food Powder."; and a lament over their 26-year separation says, "Of late, I have been missing you more than I can say. I have been taking Cold-Food Powder for a long time, but I am still weak."

The Jin dynasty Daoist scholar Ge Hong's (c. 320) Baopuzi ("[Book of the] Master Who Embraces Simplicity") contains invaluable details about the drug powders. Three of the esoteric "Inner Chapters" (1–20) refer to taking Cold-Food Powder, and using the Five Minerals to make waidan "external alchemy" miracle elixirs and magic daggers. One of the exoteric "Outer Chapters" (21–52) criticizes using Five Minerals Powder during mourning.

"The Genie's Pharmacopeia" (chap. 11) compares jade and Cold-Food Powder as drugs that can cause fevers.

Whether taken in small fragments or liquefied and sipped, jade renders man immortal. It is inferior to gold, however, in that it frequently causes fever, for it resembles han-shih-san. When jade is taken in small fragments, a spatula of both realgar and cinnabar should be taken once every ten days. Then you will not run a fever when traveling against the wind after you have taken down your hair, washed it, and bathed.

Compare Sailey's translation that after taking the drug one "loosens his hair and takes a bath: [having used] cold water, he welcomes the breeze and goes walking. Thus he does not get a fever."

Two other Baopuzi Inner Chapters mention wushi. First, "Gold and Cinnabar" (chap. 4) has several references. The Five Minerals are used to produce the Jiuguangdan (九光丹) elixir that will supposedly raise the dead.

There is also the Ninefold Radiance Elixir, which uses a method similar but not quite like that of the Nine-Cycle Elixir. Various ingredients are mixed and fired separately with each of the five minerals, cinnabar, realgar, arsenolite, laminar malachite, and magnetite [五石者, 丹砂, 雄黃, 白礜, 曾青, 慈石也]. Each mineral is put through five cycles and assumes five hues, so that altogether twenty-five hues result. Separate containers are each filled with one ounce of each hue. If you wish to raise a body that has not been dead for fully three days, bathe the corpse with a solution of one spatula of the blue elixir, open its mouth, and insert another spatula full; it will revive immediately.

The Five Minerals are also ingredients for making: "T'ai-I's elixir for Summoning Gross and Ethereal Breaths" (太乙招魂魄丹法) that can revive a corpse up to four days after death, as well as "Mo Ti's elixir" (墨子丹法), "Ch'i-li's elixir" (綺裏丹法), and "Duke Li's elixir" (李公丹法) that cure one's illnesses and, if taken over a long period, make one immortal.

Second, "Into Mountains: Over Streams" (chap. 17) tells how to make a Five Minerals protective charm that will ensure water-travel safety.

Chin chien chi [金簡記] reads; "At noon on the ping-wu day of a fifth moon pestle the Five Minerals to a mixture. The Five Minerals are realgar, cinnabar, orpiment, alum, and laminar malachite [五石者, 雄黃, 丹砂, 雌黃, 礬石, 曾青也]. When they have all been reduced to a powder, wash it in 'Gold Flower' solvent and place in a Six-One crucible, heat over cinnamon wood using a bellows. When this mixture has been completed, refine it with hardwood charcoal, having young girls and boys approach the fire. With a male mixture, make a male dagger; with a female one, make a female dagger, each of them 5.5 inches long. (Earth's number, 5, is used in order to suppress the stream's powers.) Wear these daggers when traveling on water, and no crocodiles, dragons, large fish, or water gods will dare approach you."

Compared with the previous Baopuzi list of the Five Minerals, this one replaces arsenolite (白礜) and magnetite (慈石) with orpiment (雌黃) and alum (礬石). Note the logographic similarity between 礜 and 礬.

One Outer Chapter, "Censuring Muddle-headedness" (chap. 26), abbreviates wushisan as shisan (石散) in criticizing mourners who use the drug.

I have also heard that noblemen, when in the 'great sorrow' [mourning a parent's death], or when they take [wu-]shih-san, have several meals [to get the drug to circulate in the body]. People drink great amounts of wine as if one's life depended upon it. When their illness has reached the crisis stage, they cannot endure the wind and the cold [from the fever]. ... "It gets to the point where they become very drunk. They say, 'This is the custom in the capital, Loyang.' Is this not a sad thing?

Ge Hong's friend Ji Han (嵇含 c. 262–306) wrote a fu "rhapsody; poetic exposition" on Cold-Food Powder, which claims "it cured his ailing son when other treatments had failed".

The (554) Book of Wei records that both the Northern Wei emperors Daowu (r. 386–409) and Mingyuan (r. 409–423) often took Cold-Food Powder, and "In the end, they were 'unable to handle state affairs' and eventually died of elixir poisoning." Wagner noted that the Northern Wei "barbarian" rulers regarded the drug as a "status symbol."

The Liu Song dynasty (420–479) "A New Account of the Tales of the World" (世說新語; Shishuo xinyu), compiled by Liu Yiqing (劉義慶, 403–444), contains contemporary references to using the drug. The text uses xingsan four times, wushisan once, fusan (服散 "take powder") once, and has two references to harmful side effects.

The Shishuo xinyu only directly refers to wushisan in quoting He Yan (see above), "Whenever I take a five-mineral powder, not only does it heal any illness I may have, but I am also aware of my spirit and intelligence becoming receptive and lucid" [服五石散, 非唯治病, 亦覺神明開朗]. The commentary of Liu Xun (劉峻, 462–521) explains,

Although the prescription for the cold-food powder (han-shih san) originated during the Han period, its users were few and there are no accounts handed down concerning them. It was the Wei president of the Board of Civil Office, Ho Yen, who first discovered its divine properties, and from his time on it enjoyed a wide currency in the world, and those who used it sought each other out.

Two contexts refer to Wang Chen (王忱, d. 392), son of the Eastern Jin official Wang Tanzhi. First, Wang Chen enjoyed taking wushisan with his lifelong friend Wang Gong (王恭, d. 398), brother of Jin dynasty Empress Wang Fahui.

Wang Kung was at first extremely fond of Wang Ch'en, but later, encountering the alienation of Yüan Yüeh, the two eventually became mutually suspicious and estranged. However, whenever either of them came upon any exhilarating experience, there would unavoidably be times when they missed each other. Kung was once walking after having taken a powder (hsing-san), on the way to the archery hall at Ching-k'ou (near Chien-k'ang). At the time the clear dewdrops were gleaming in the early morning light, and the new leaves of the paulownia were just beginning to unfold. Kung looked at them and said, "Wang Ch'en is surely and unmistakably as clear and shining as these!"

Keith McMahon cites the Wangs' wushisan camaraderie as a historical analogy for 19th-century opium addicts.

In one old anecdote, two fourth-century friends of considerable status think fondly of each other whenever they have a euphoric experience. One of the friends takes the powder and, coming upon a beautiful scene, immediately thinks of the brilliance of his absent friend. It was not necessarily that individuals took the powder together at the same time, but that people of like interests and status enjoyed the special effects of this drug and did so without embarrassment or sense of shameful indulgence.

Second, when Huan Xuan was summoned to the capital in 387 to serve the crown prince Sima Dezong, his friend Wang Chen came to visit,and was "slightly drunk after having taken a powder [fusan 服散]" ... Huan set out wine for him, but since he was unable to drink it cold (because of the powder), Huan unthinkingly said to his attendants, 'Have them warm (wen) the wine and bring it back.' After doing so, he burst into tears and cried out, choking with grief." The commentary explains that Huan, who tended to be overemotional, violated the Chinese naming taboo of his deceased father Huan Wen (桓溫) when he said wen (溫 "warm").

Two Shishuo xinyu contexts mention medical problems that commentators identify as wushisan side effects. When Yin Ji (殷覬, d. 397—"apparently from an overdose of drugs") learned his cousin Yin Zhongkan (殷仲堪, d. 399) was plotting a coup, he refused to participate, took wushisan, and walked away in resignation from his post. "When Yin Chi's illness became critical [bingkun 病困], when he looked at a person, he only saw half of his face", citing Yu Jixia that "temporary impairment of vision" was one harmful effect. When Bian Fanzhi (卞範之) was capital intendant for Huan Xuan in 402, his friend Yang Fu (羊孚, c. 373–403) sought help for a bad reaction to wushisan. Yang went to Bian's house and said, "My illness is acting up [zhidong 疾動], and I can't endure sitting up." Bian had him lie down on a large bed, and "sat keeping vigil by his side from morning until evening."

=== Tang dynasty ===
The Tang dynasty (618–908) era was the final heyday for Cold-Food Powder drug users. According to Sun Simiao's (c. 670) Qianjin yifang (千金要方; "Supplement to the thousand Golden Remedies"), the powder "contained five mineral drugs — fluorite, quartz, red bole clay, stalactite and sulfur, one animal drug, and nine plant drugs. It was claimed to be effective in curing many diseases and in increasing vitality, but was also said to have several side effects."

Needham and Lu refer to Sun's prescriptions for wushisan ("powder of the five minerals") and hanshisan swallowed-cold powder, as well as wushi gengsheng san (五石更生散; "five minerals resurrection powder"), and wushi huming san (石護命散; "five minerals life-preserving powder"), "all to be used in cases of sexual debility". Sun Simiao attributed one formula, the cishi hanshisan (紫石寒食散; "purple mineral cold powder") to the Han dynasty doctor Zhang Zhongjing, and remarked, "There have also been those who have acquired an addiction to the Five-Mineral preparations on account of their avidity for the pleasures of the bedchamber", namely Daoist sexual practices. They conclude, "China was certainly not the only civilisation to believe that arsenic had aphrodisiac properties; such a view long prevailed in the West." Needham and Lu quote Fan Xingjun (范行準) on historical developments in Chinese aphrodisiacs.

The ancients of Chou and Han times, he said, relied upon perfumes (hsiang), wine and beguilements (chiu, yu huo); in Chin and Northern Wei the mineral mixtures (such as Han Shih San) were famous; Thang and Northern Sung people consumed especially the alchemical elixirs (chin tan), generally mercurial and often doubtless arsenical. Then in the Southern Sung came the regular isolation of mixtures of steroid sex hormones (chiu shih, hung chhien), much used in Yuan and Ming, while the Chhing afterwards succumbed to opium (yaphien).

While Chinese historians have traditionally believed the practice of consuming hanshisan persisted into the Tang dynasty and almost disappeared afterwards, Obringer thinks, "it may be more accurate to say that the name of the drug has been eclipsed, but not the habit of taking it." Evidencing the disappearance of the name wushisan, Obringer compares parallel descriptions of exactly the same medical treatments and troubles for drug-using patients. The (752) Waitai biyao (外台秘要; "Arcane Essentials from the Imperial Library"), compiled by Wang Tao (王焘), quotes the rules for wushisan users; the (992) Taiping shenghui fang (太平聖惠方; "Imperial Grace Formulary of the Taiping Era [976–983]") medical compendium, which does not mention wushisan or hanshisan, quotes them for rushi (乳石; "stalactite and quartz") users.

=== Song dynasty ===
During the Song dynasty (960–1279) period, Englehardt says, "Cold-Food Powder was ethically condemned and became synonymous with a heterodox ideology and an immoral lifestyle. This may explain why the name of the drug was banned after the Tang, while the use of identical pharmaceutical drugs has continued under different names."

Su Shi's (1060) Dongpo zhilin ("Recollections of Su Dongpo") exemplifies Song era moral condemnation of the drug: "The vogue for taking stalactite and aconite, for stooping to alcoholic and sexual debaucheries in order to obtain long life began in the times of He Yan. This person, in his youth, was wealthy and of noble birth: he took hanshisan to maintain his concupiscence. It is not surprising that the habit was sufficient to kill, day by day, himself and his clan."

Dikötter et ll says that "From the Song onwards, mineral powders became more varied, including increasing quantities of medical herbs, ginger, ginseng and oyster extract, thus changing in character from alchemical substances to formal medicines (yao)."

== Ingredients ==
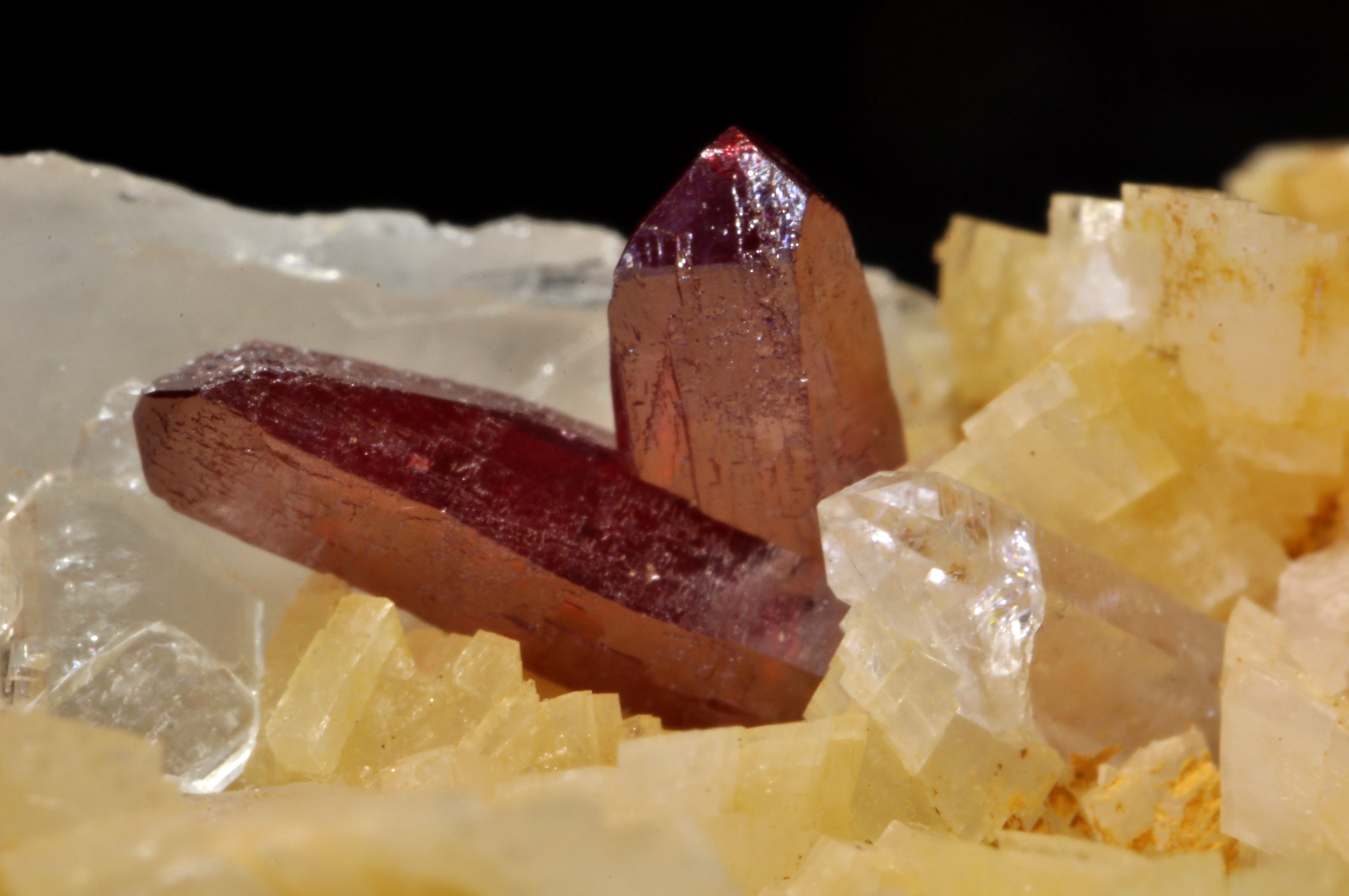
Cinnabar (mercury sulfide), quartz (silicon dioxide), and dolomite crystals (calcium magnesium carbonate) from Hunan, China

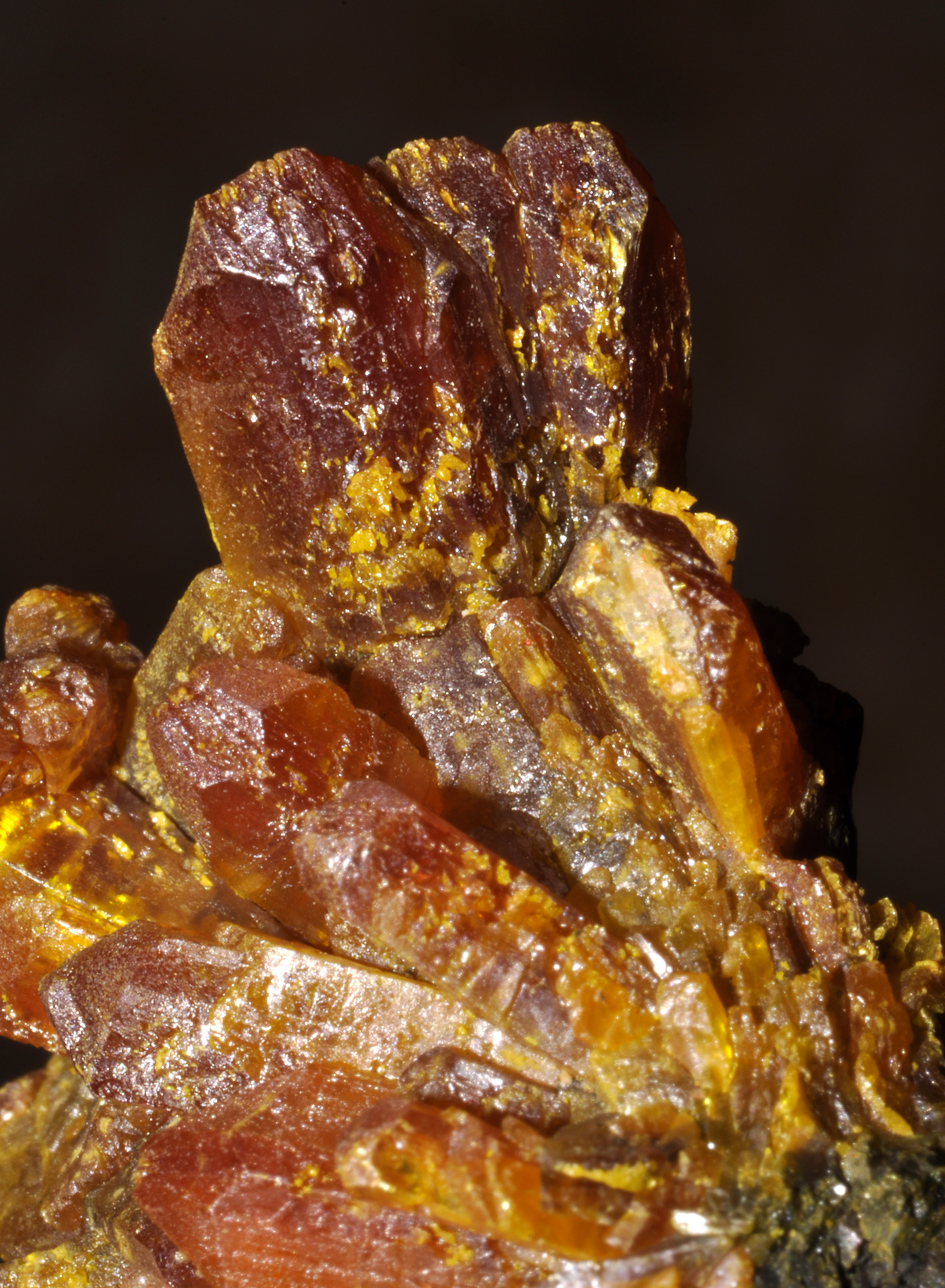
Orpiment (arsenic sulfide) from China

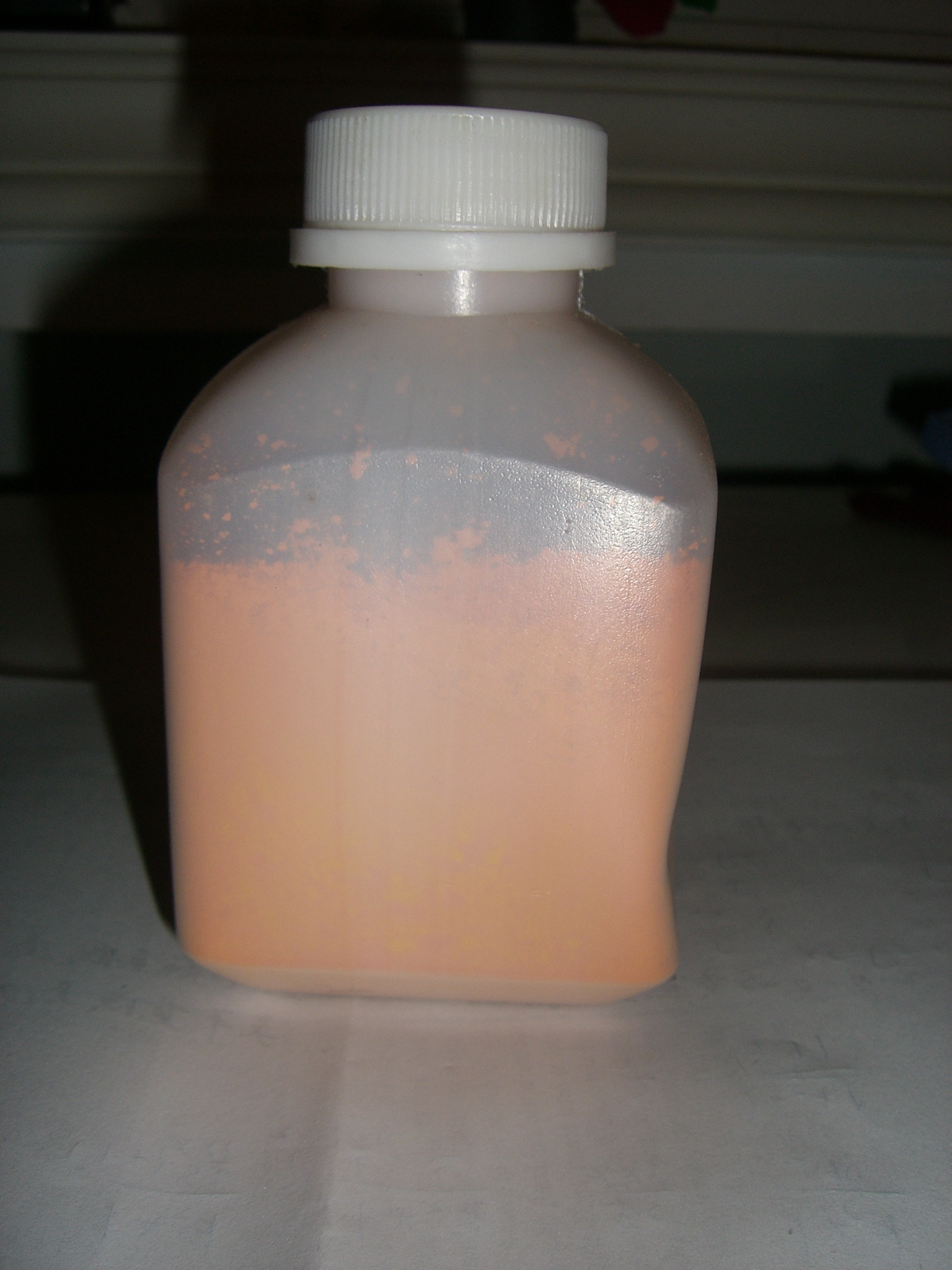
Prepared realgar (arsenic sulphide)

The precise components of hanshisan or wushisan are uncertain. Sailey describes the difficulties in identifying the ingredients.

The drug has not been made since the Tang; surely, if scholars believed they could make it, they would have tried. Also, there is the problem that the term chih 脂 (paste) implies the addition of other materials to make it congeal, materials which are not identified. ... Perhaps the greatest problem of all, though, is the fact that drug-makers have traditionally guarded their secrets well, and references to major ingredients by color lead the reader to the inevitable conclusion that an esoteric formula is being used, hinting at, rather than explicitly stating, the contents of the mixture.

Needham estimates "at least a half dozen" quite different ingredient lists, "all from authoritative sources."

The Baopuzi records two different lists of the Five Minerals (given below with literal meanings). Chapter 4 "Jindan" lists dansha (丹砂; 'red sand'), xionghuang (雄黃; 'male yellow'), báiyù (白礜; 'arsenolite'), cengqing (曾青; 'once green'), and cishi (慈石; 'compassionate stone'), cf. ci (磁; "magnet"). English translations include:

- cinnabar, realgar, pai-fan (synonymous with 礬石; fan-shih; "potash alum"), malachite and tz'u-shih (magnetic iron ore, magnetite, black oxide of iron)
- cinnabar, realgar, arsenolite, laminar malachite, and magnetite
- cinnabar, realgar, purified potash alum, stratified malachite, and magnetite – Needham translates báiyù (白礜) as "purified potash alum" rather than "arsenolite", rationalizing it as a misspelling of báifán (白礬).

Chapter 17 lists xionghuang, dansha, cihuang (雌黃; 'female yellow'), fanshi (礬石; 'alum stone'), and cengqing.

- realgar, cinnabar, orpiment, alum, and laminar malachite

Note the "male/female yellow" contrast between orange-red xionghuang (雄黃; "realgar") and yellow-red cihuang (雌黃; "orpiment"). Compared with chapter 4's list of the Five Minerals, this version rearranges three ingredients (cinnabar, realgar, and stratified malachite) and replaces two: baifan (白礬; "arsenolite") with cihuang (雌黃; "orpiment") and cishi (慈石; "magnetite") with the graphically similar fanshi (礬石; "alum"). In traditional wuxing "five phases/elements" theory, the correlating wuse (五色 "five colors") are blue, yellow, red, white, and black (青, 赤, 黄, 白, and 黑). Needham says,

The [chapter 4] series cinnabar, realgar, alum, malachite and magnetite would be most consonant with the colours (red, yellow, white, caerulean and black) required in the traditional five-element symbolic correlations, so it may have been one of the earliest. Yu shih [yùshí] ([礜石] arsenolite), also white, because of the similarity of its orthography, tended to get substituted for fan shih [fánshí] ([礬石] alum) but the latter is much more common in the alchemical texts—here perhaps was a real pitfall for the unwary experimentalist.

Ingredients listed in the above Tang dynasty Qianjin yifang include " five mineral drugs (fluorite, quartz, red bole clay, (Note: In the Pharmacopoeia of the People's Republic of China and other modern TCM works, chìshízhǐ is identified as red-colored halloysite.) stalactite and sulphur), one animal drug (shell of Cyclina sinensis, a type of clam) and nine plant drugs (Saposhnikovia divaricata, Trichosanthes kirilowii, Atractylodes macrocephala, Panax ginseng, Platycodon grandiflorus, Asarum sieboldii, Zingiber officinale, Cinnamomum cassia and Aconitum sp.). Besides giving this detailed hanshisan formula, the Qianjinfang ironically warns the toxicity "was so great that one was compelled to burn any record of its formula". Mather translates the five mineral substances as: "stalactite" (石鐘乳; shih-chung-ju), "sulphur" (石硫磺; shih-liuhuang), "milky quartz" (白石英; pai-shih-ying), "amethyst" (紫石英; tzu-shih-ying), (Note: In the Pharmacopoeia of the People's Republic of China and other modern TCM works, zishiying is identified as purple-colored fluorite rather than amethyst, which is chemically similar to quartz.) and "red bole or ochre" (赤石脂; ch'ih-shih-chih)."

Based upon numerous hanshisan recipes, Wagner's "Das Rezept des Ho Yen" lists 13 ingredients: First, 2.5 liang (兩; "tael") of six ingredients: zhongru (鐘乳; "stalactite"), baishiying (白石英; "milky quartz"), haige (海蛤; "oyster shell"), zishiying (紫石英; "purple quartz"), fangfeng (防風; "Saposhnikovia divaricata"), and gualou (栝樓; "Trichosanthes kirilowii fruit"). Second, 1.5 liang of two: ganjiang (幹薑; "Zingiber officinale; dried ginger") and baishu (白术; "Atractylis ovata"). Third, 5 fen (分; "candareen") of two ingredients: jiegeng (桔梗; "Platycodon grandiflorus; Chinese bellflower") and xixin (細辛; "Asarum sieboldii; Chinese wild ginger"). Fourth, 3 fen of three: renshen (人參; "Panax ginseng; ginseng"), fuzi (附子; "Aconitum lycoctonum; monkshood"), and guixin (桂心; "Cinnamomum cassia; cinnamon; cassia-bark tree"). Sailey criticizes a "number of difficulties" in Wagner's attempts to identify the drug's ingredients. Schipper summarizes Wagner's recipe as "stalactite milk and quartz, along with some realgar and orpiment, as well as a mixture of circulation-increasing medicinal plants like ginseng and ginger."

Some of these ingredients, such as bellflower and cinnamon, are tonic and can be used medicinally. Other ingredients are highly toxic. Cinnabar is the ore for mercury. Realgar, orpiment, and arsenolite contain arsenic – but magnetite removes arsenic from water. The element Fluorine is highly reactive and poisonous, but its calcium salt, the mineral fluorite, is not. Aconitum species are numbered among the world's most toxic plants. The Dutch historian Frank Dikötter suggests, "Resembling fresh blood, the realgar was probably an early ingredient in alchemical attempts at creating an elixir of immortality."

== Usage ==
Chinese sources provide little reliable information about how hanshisan was prepared and used.

There are only a few discussions of the actual manner in which the drug was taken. Apparently it was taken in three doses, sometimes with food. Numerous sources mention that the drug was washed down with wine, sometimes heated, sometimes cold. This undoubtedly was to heighten the effects of the drug, but certainly, it must have made it more dangerous to the body. We are also told that after consuming the drug, it was necessary to "circulate the powder" (hsing-san 行散), that is, to move about so that the drug would circulate in the bloodstream. (Sailey 1978:427)

"Wine" is the common English translation of Chinese jiu (酒 "Chinese alcoholic beverages"), which inclusively means "beer", "wine," and "liquor".

Sailey notes that early drugs certainly varied in purity and quality, and "this factor certainly must have influenced the effectiveness of han-shih san."

== Effects ==
Cold-Food Powder had both positive and negative effects, which could sometimes be incongruous, such as having "simultaneously tranquilizing and exhilarating properties".

Obringer classifies 52 symptoms described by Huangfu Mi.

- Pain: Various pains appeared very often, and occurred in almost every part of the body: head, waist, heart, throat, extremities, arms and legs, skin, and eyes.
- Digestive disorders: Swollen stomach, diarrhea, lack of appetite, constipation.
- Urinary troubles: Strangury, frequent micturitions.
- Fever symptoms: Fever, chills, sensation of cold with involuntary shivering.
- Pulmonary disorders: qi 氣 (life-breath) back flow in the chest, coughing.
- Sensorial troubles: These mainly concern eyes and vision: eye pain, sight trouble, dizzy spells, but also buzzing noise in the ears, and loss of smell.
- Skin troubles: This category is very important. Two great groups are mentioned: the first consists of all kinds of "rottenness" of flesh; the second is the group of cutaneous disorders like abscesses, ulcers, especially on the legs and on the back.
- Behavioural disorders: Huangfu Mi relates, in a one passage, his own experience of depression and suicidal tendencies after ingesting the drug. A trail of troubles like insomnia, anxiety, sadness, confusion, and fright are also described.
- States of shock: Cases of dramatic troubles like loss of consciousness, stoppage of breath or falling into comatose states are said to occur sometimes after taking the powder.

Obringer notes that acute or chronic arsenic poisoning can cause many of these symptoms: "abdominal pains, diarrhea, nasal and ocular congestion, cutaneous disorders, pains in the extremities, vision troubles (in relation, we know, with optical neuritis)."

Sailey summarizes Yu Jiaxi's comprehensive Chinese-language analysis.

He stresses the idea that the effectiveness of the drug lay in its ability to create warmth. If the taker went too far, he would catch a fever, while if he cooled off too quickly, it would be extremely dangerous. Yu maintains that the greatest danger would occur (1) if the drug was taken too often, (2) if it was taken merely for stimulation and not to cure a serious illness, or (3) if the heat entered the marrow. In the last case, Yu believes, chronic illness and even death might result. In comparing the drug to opium, he notes that it could create even more injurious effects, but he conjectures that it was not addictive if taken twenty or thirty days apart. Yu believes that the drug "caused death or at least chronic disease that in the end could not be cured."

The Baopuzi translation of Sailey notes that hanshisan had "different types of effects upon different types of people, and even to have affected the same person differently depending on his mood when he took the drug. In some cases it led to depression, suicide, or madness; in others it resulted in anger, lethargy, changes in appetite, or disregard of custom." Sailey also says, "Having initially been used as a medicine to cure severe illnesses, its mind-expanding properties were apparently discovered and exploited during the mid-third century, which marked a high point in the development of all sorts of drugs and medicines made from organic and inorganic substances."

Schipper gives a detailed description of the powder's efficacies.

One of the immediate effects of this drug was a sharp elevation in the body's temperature, forcing the user to drink a lot and to eat cold things; hence its name. Among the beneficial effects of this drug, the most frequently mentioned are sedation, an increase in aesthetic sensitivity, vision, and sexual energy, and greater physical resistance. The drug may also have been hallucinogenic. Aside from the immoderate rise in body temperature, other disadvantages included a gradual decrease in intellectual capacity, partial paralysis, aches and inflammation of the joints, ulcers, intercostal pains, and, over time, a general deterioration of the body. It was extremely important to follow the prescriptions regarding when and how much of the drug was to be taken. The powder was mixed with warm wine and had, like opium and heroin, an immediate effect. But if one made a mistake in the dose or the timing, or if one was not in a good psychological frame of mind (that is, too nervous, worried, sad, et cetera), the drug "rose" too fast, bringing on not only a depression, but also intolerable pain.

== Influences on society and culture ==
For an obsolescent drug that was only popular during a few centuries in Medieval Chinese society, Cold-Food Powder was highly influential.

Lu Xun claimed, "most of the famous men [of Wei-Chin] took drugs." Based upon historical accounts of hanshisan users, scholars generally associate the drug with the scholar-gentry social class. However, Akahori Akira proposes an economic class distinction between users of the two popular drugs during the Three Kingdoms period. Only the "rich and powerful" could afford the rare Chinese alchemy ingredients for dan (丹 "cinnabar") elixirs of immortality – "Common folk instead took drugs that were easier to get, like cold-food powder (which, though actually less toxic, would cause a greater number of deaths)." In addition, Lu Xun compared the ingestion of hanshisan powder to opium addiction in China during the nineteenth century.

During the Six Dynasties period, Chinese society was generally uncritical of hanshisan, which Sailey calls an "unexpected silence".

We hear scholars condemn the use of the drug only for two reasons: its danger to health, and, as in the case of Ko Hung, its use during the mourning period and at times when the taking of stimulants is inappropriate or disrespectful. Use of drugs such as han-shih san was apparently never regarded as illegal, immoral, or basically wrong. This "drug culture'" of han-shih san apparently, as Wagner suggests, integrated itself into the activities of wine-drinkers and skirt-chasers. Curiously, this may have led to its demise by T'ang times, since it could not compete with presumably less dangerous forms of entertainment.

This refers to Ge Hong's Baopuzi above (26) criticism of "noblemen" from Luoyang who violated mourning rules by taking wushisan and getting drunk. Ge, who praises many other drugs as integral to achieving xian immortality, only denounces this "powerful hallucinogenic" drug as contributing to the "decline of propriety and morality" and "disorder in society". In addition, Sailey suggests that Southerners like Ge Hong opposed hanshisan because it probably originated in North China and was not widely used in the South until after the fall of Luoyang in 317. "Users of the drug comprised, at least in their own eyes, an elite group. This caused envy on the part of certain other people." In Ge Hong's time, "there must have been an association between the drug on the one hand and the Northerners' image as occupiers who discriminated against the scholars of the South with regard to holding high office on the other."

The German sinologist Rudolf G. Wagner, cited by Sailey, speculated that hanshisan, which was associated with "greater mental awareness and perceptiveness", was used by some Chinese Buddhists. For instance, Huiyi (慧義, 372–444) who infamously ingratiated himself with Emperor Wu of Liu Song and General Fan Tai.

Audry Spiro proposes that wushisan transformed Chinese clothing fashions during the Wei-Jin period.

This temporary restorer of vitality had an important influence on fashions of the day. To ensure efficacy and avoid negative effects, the user had to consume heated wine and to exercise after taking it. The resulting fever required the wearing of thin, loose clothing. Skin lesions, among the many negative consequences of this drug (which may have contained arsenic), also dictated the necessity for loose clothing. For the same reason, close-fitting shoes or slippers that exacerbated the lesions could not be worn, and they were replaced by clogs. It is obvious that the use of five-mineral powder required a specific regimen, one clearly not appropriate for attendance at court. Strolling in clogs and drinking wine, the wide robe loosely belted—some men dressed and behaved this way because they took the powder. Others of their class, eschewing the powder, nevertheless adopted the lifestyle. It became, in short, the fashion.

Using the drug powders was associated with Chinese poetry. Huang Junjie and Erik Zürcher say that when the Seven Sages of the Bamboo Grove took wushisan, "they had to drink cold liquor and take walking excursions in order to avoid arsenic poisoning. Intoxicated enchantment with nature's beauty led to their writing poems on landscape, and thus they initiated the genre of 'Nature Poetry'."

== See also ==
- Chinese alchemical elixir poisoning
- List of traditional Chinese medicines
- Realgar wine
