= Long Corridor =

Covered walkway in Beijing, China

Coordinates: 39°59′49.6″N 116°16′15″E

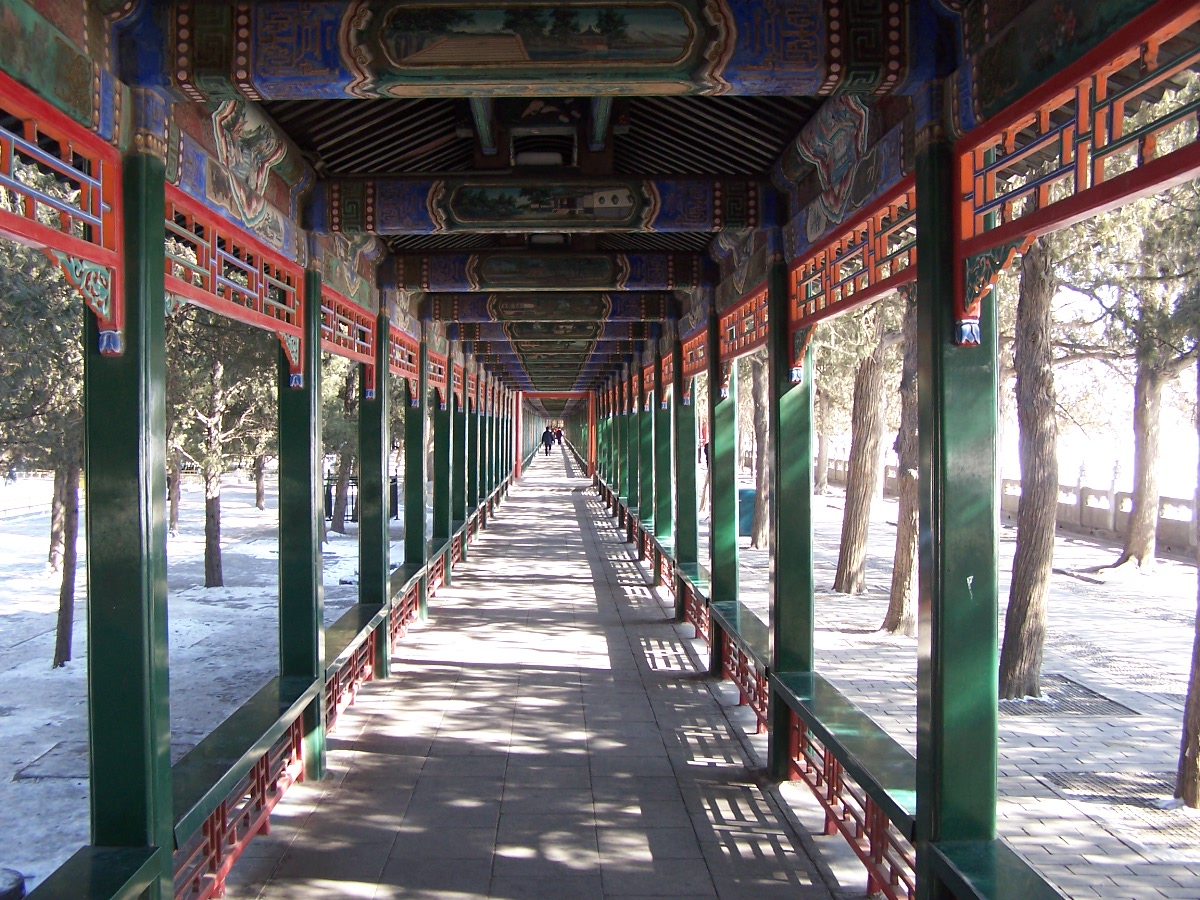
The Long Corridor

The Long Corridor (simplified Chinese: 长廊; traditional Chinese: 長廊; pinyin: Cháng Láng) is a covered walkway in the Summer Palace in Beijing, China. First erected in the middle of the 18th century, it is famous for its 728 m (2,388 ft) length in conjunction with its rich painted decoration (more than 14,000 paintings).

== History ==
The Long Corridor was first built in 1750, when the Qianlong Emperor commissioned work to convert the area into an imperial garden. The corridor was constructed so that the emperor's mother could enjoy a walk through the gardens protected from the elements. Like most of the Summer Palace, the Long Corridor was severely damaged by fire which Anglo-French allied forces laid in 1860 during the Second Opium War. It was rebuilt in 1886. As a part of the Summer Palace, the Long Corridor was included on the UNESCO World Heritage List in December 1998.

== Layout ==
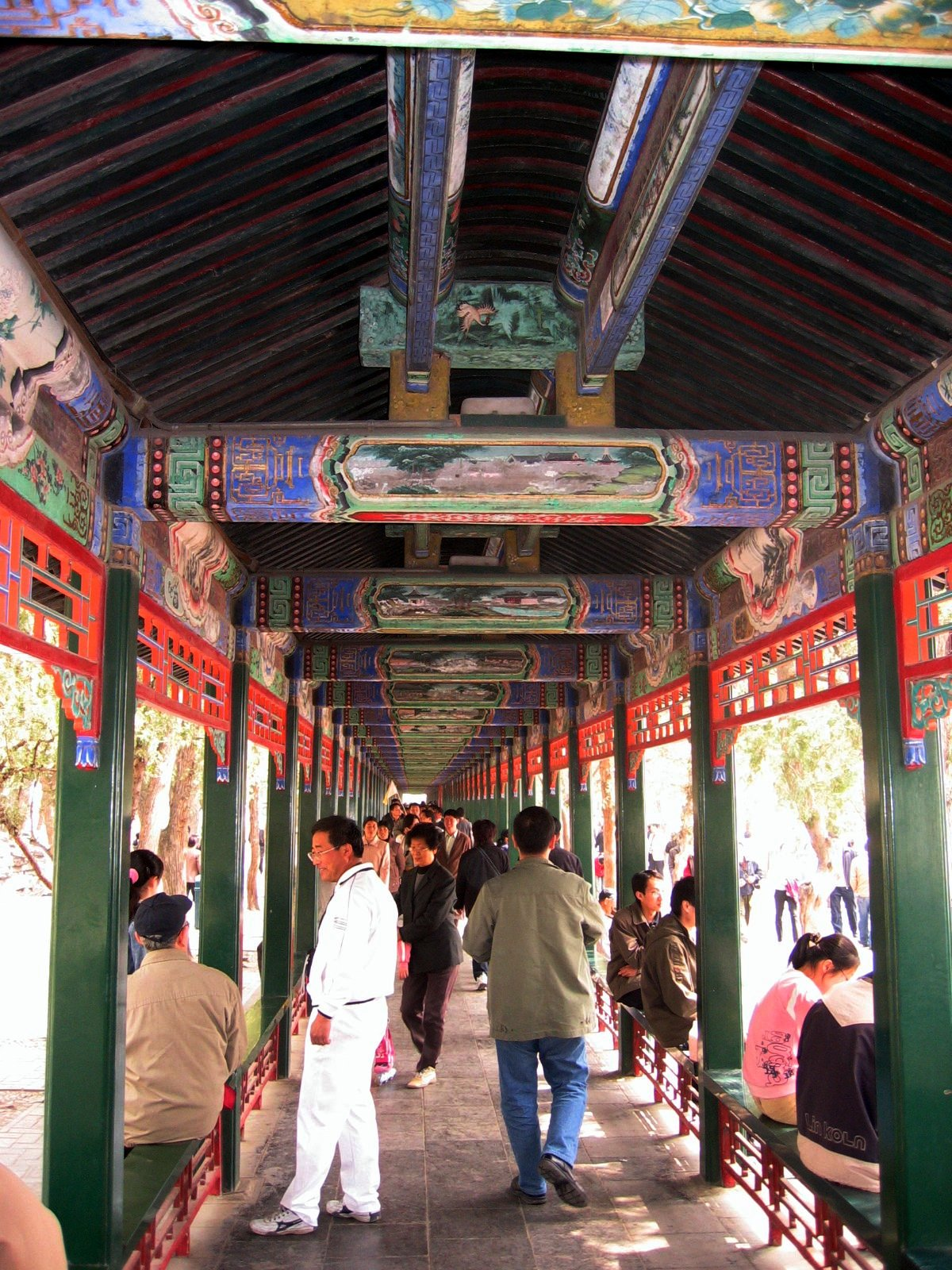
Visitors in the Long Corridor

The Long Corridor leads from the Gate for Greeting the Moon (Yao Yue Men) in the east westwards along the northern shore of Kunming Lake. Along its entire length, it keeps to the transitional zone between the lake shore and the foot of the Longevity Hill, which is on the opposite side of the corridor. The Marble Boat, a landmark lakeside pavilion, is located near the western end of the corridor. The middle section of the Long Corridor passes in a southward bend around the central building complex on the lake side of Longevity Hill, The main hall in this complex is the Cloud-Dispelling Hall (Pai Yun Dian), where the Empress Dowager Cixi used to celebrate her birthday. The Long Corridor runs through the Cloud-Dispelling Gate (Pai Yun Men) that marks the center of the corridor. The Gate is a landmark in its own right and covered in paintings.

The total length of the Long Corridor is 728 metres (2,388 ft), with crossbeams under the roof dividing it into 273 sections. Along its course, there are four octagonal pavilions with double eaves, two on each side of the Cloud-Dispelling Gate. The pavilions symbolize the four seasons (spring, summer, autumn, winter) and are named (from east to west): Liu Jia (Chinese: 留佳; pinyin: Liú Jiā, "retaining the goodness"), Ji Lan (Chinese: 寄澜; pinyin: Jì Lán, "living with the ripples"), Qiu Shui (Chinese: 秋水; pinyin: Qiū Shuǐ, "autumn water"), and Qing Yao (Chinese: 清遥; pinyin: Qīng Yáo, "clear and far"). Midway between the two pavilions on either side of the Cloud-Dispelling Gate, pavilions on the lake shore can be reached through short southward extension of the Long Corridor: the Facing-the-Seagull Boat (Dui Ou Fang) Pavilion in the east and the Fish-and-Algae Pavilion (Yu Zao Xuan) in the west. In the west, there is also a northward extension opposite of the Fish-and-Algae Pavilion, which leads to a three-storey octagonal observation tower. The long corridor is called 长廊 in Chinese.

== Artwork ==
The Long Corridor is richly decorated with paintings on the beams and the ceiling. In total there are more than 14,000 paintings, which depict episodes from Chinese classical literature, folk tales, both historical and legendary figures, and famous Chinese buildings and landscapes along with flowers, birds, fish, and insects. In each of the four pavilions, there are two major paintings over the two doorways on the eastern and western sides. The topics of these paintings are described below (from east to west):

=== The Tale of the Peach-Blossom Land ===
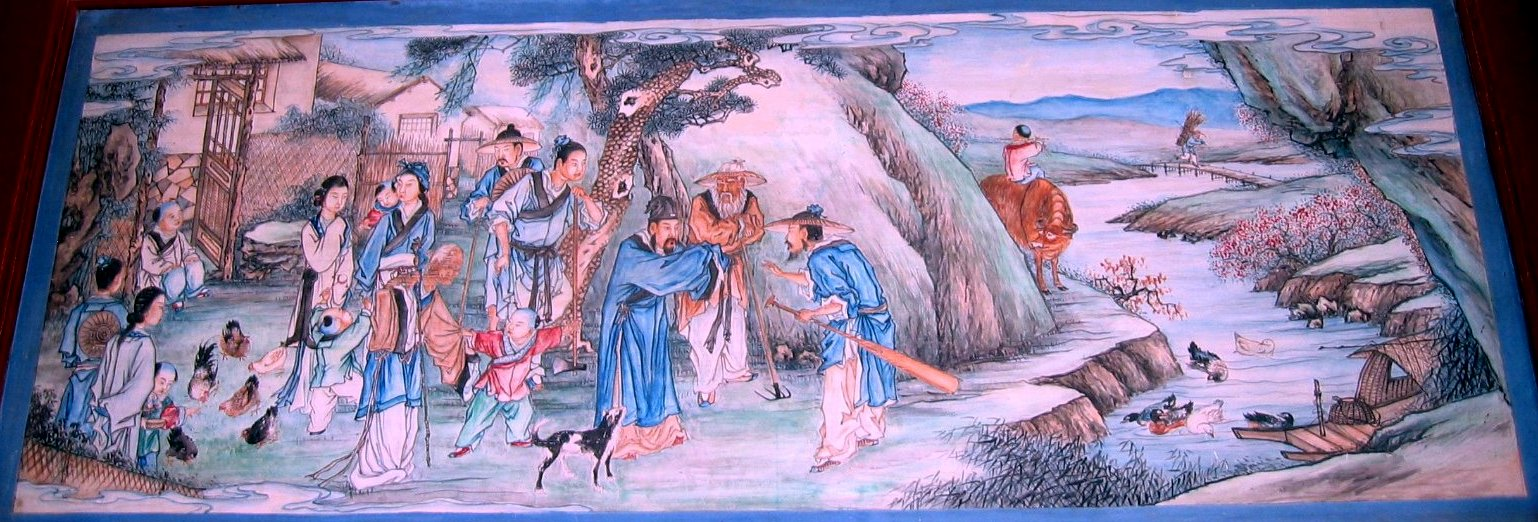
The Tale of the Peach-Blossom Land

The "Tale of the Peach-Blossom Land" (Chinese: 桃花源記; pinyin: Taohuayuan Ji) is set during the reign of Emperor Xiaowu of the Eastern Jin dynasty. It tells the story of a fisherman who discovers a secluded valley (Shi Wai Tao Yuan) located on the other side of a narrow cave. The inhabitants of the valley were the descendants of war refugees from the times of the Qin dynasty. They had lived in this utopia untroubled by the further course of history in peace and harmony ever since. The fisherman returned home to tell the story, but the idyllic valley could never be found again.

=== Sun Wukong's Fight with Nezha ===
The painting depicts an episode from the Chinese classic Journey to the West. In the episode, the monkey king Sun Wukong is fighting the boy god Nezha, who was sent by the Jade Emperor to capture Sun Wukong. In the fight, both Nezha and Sun Wukong transform themselves into gods with three heads and six arms. In the painting, Nezha is depicted on a fire wheel, which is commonly associated with him as his way of transport.

=== Zhang Fei's Fight with Ma Chao ===
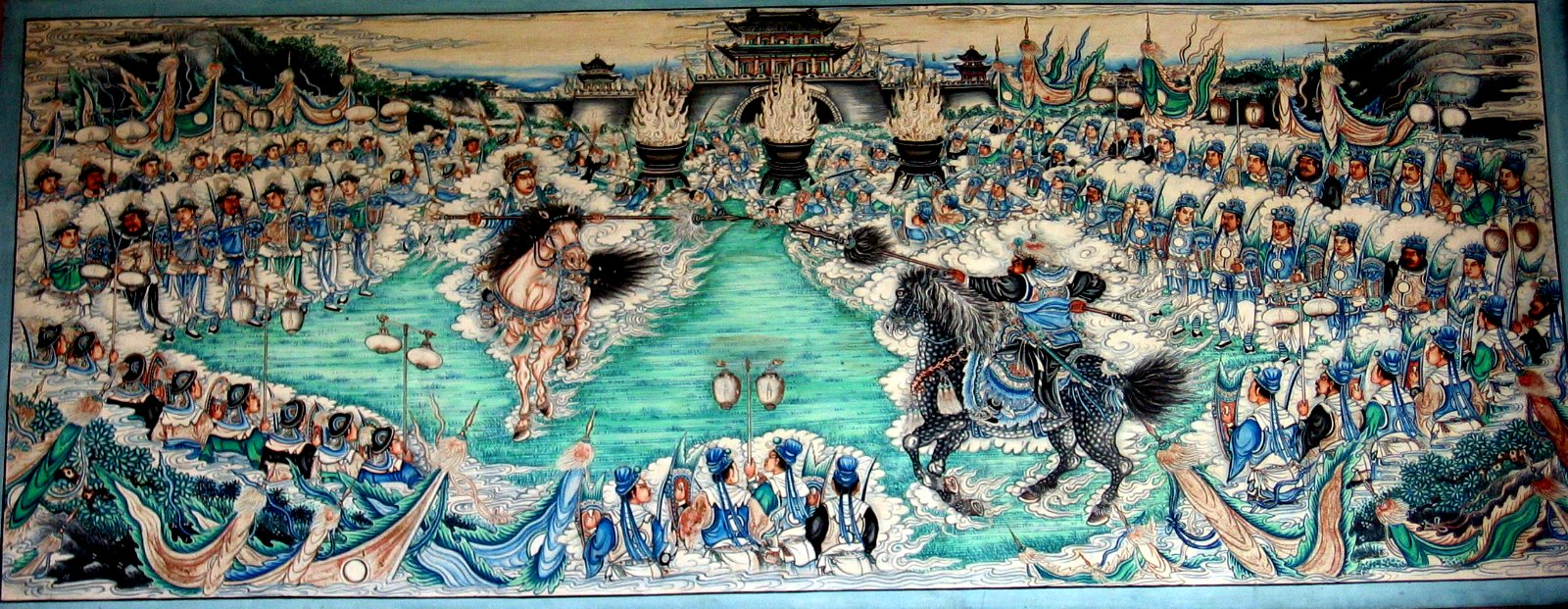
Zhang Fei's Fight with Ma Chao

The subject of this painting is a fierce, stalemate battle between two of the future Five Tiger Generals of the Shu Han, Zhang Fei and Ma Chao, in the Battle of Jiameng Pass. The story is taken from the 14th century historical novel Romance of the Three Kingdoms, one of the Four Classical Novels of Chinese Literature.

=== The Battle of Zhuxian County ===
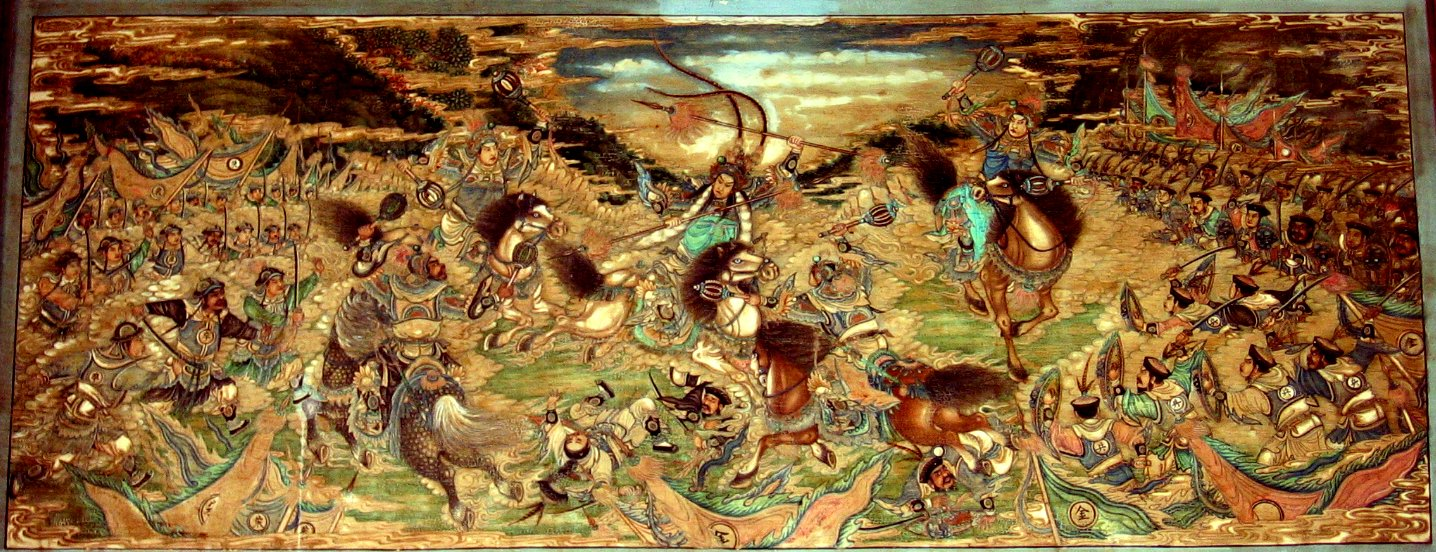
Battle of Zhuxian County

This painting shows scenes from a decisive battle in the war between the Jin and the Song dynasty. Yue Fei, a Song dynasty general, distinguished himself in combatting an invasion by the Jin army. In the Battle of Zhuxian County, the Song army came close to losing, but the courage of a total of four generals was able to turn the near loss into a decisive victory.

=== Yue Fei Defeating Prince of Liang with a Spear ===
Like in the Battle of Zhuxian County, a story about the Song dynasty hero Yue Fei is the subject of this painting. It shows Yue Fei engaged in a fight with Chai Gui Prince of Liang, scion of a wealthy family, who wanted to bribe himself through a military exam. In the painting, Yue Fei kills Chai Gui, who is falling from his horse in the scene, by thrusting a spear at his heart.

=== The Seven Sages of the Bamboo Grove ===
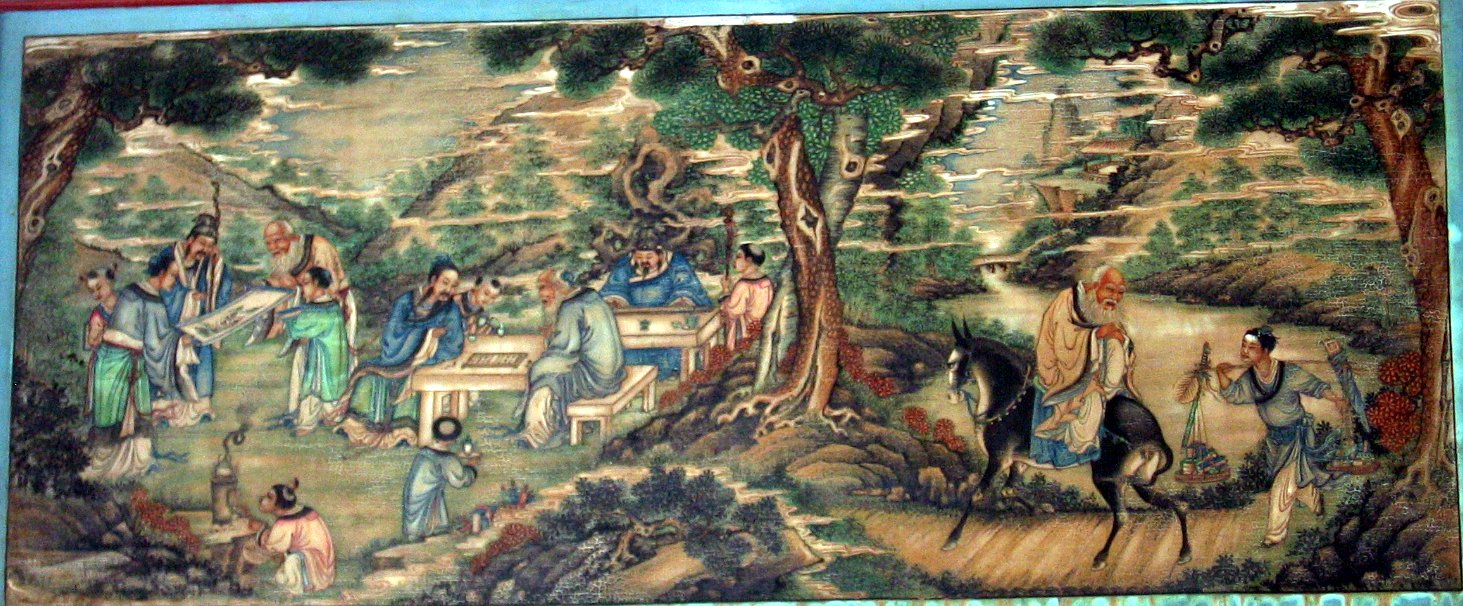
The Seven Sages of the Bamboo Grove

This painting is located on the western side of Qiu Shui Pavilion. It shows seven passionate literati of the 3rd century, known as the Seven Sages of the Bamboo Grove. The scholars, Ruan Ji, Ji Kang, Ruan Xian, Shan Tao, Xiang Xiu, Wang Rong and Liu Ling, held progressive political views but were unable to realize their ambitions. As a reaction, they refused to seek fame and wealth and took to entertaining themselves in a bamboo wood with composing poetry, food, music, and chess play instead.

=== Zhao Yun's Fight at Changban ===
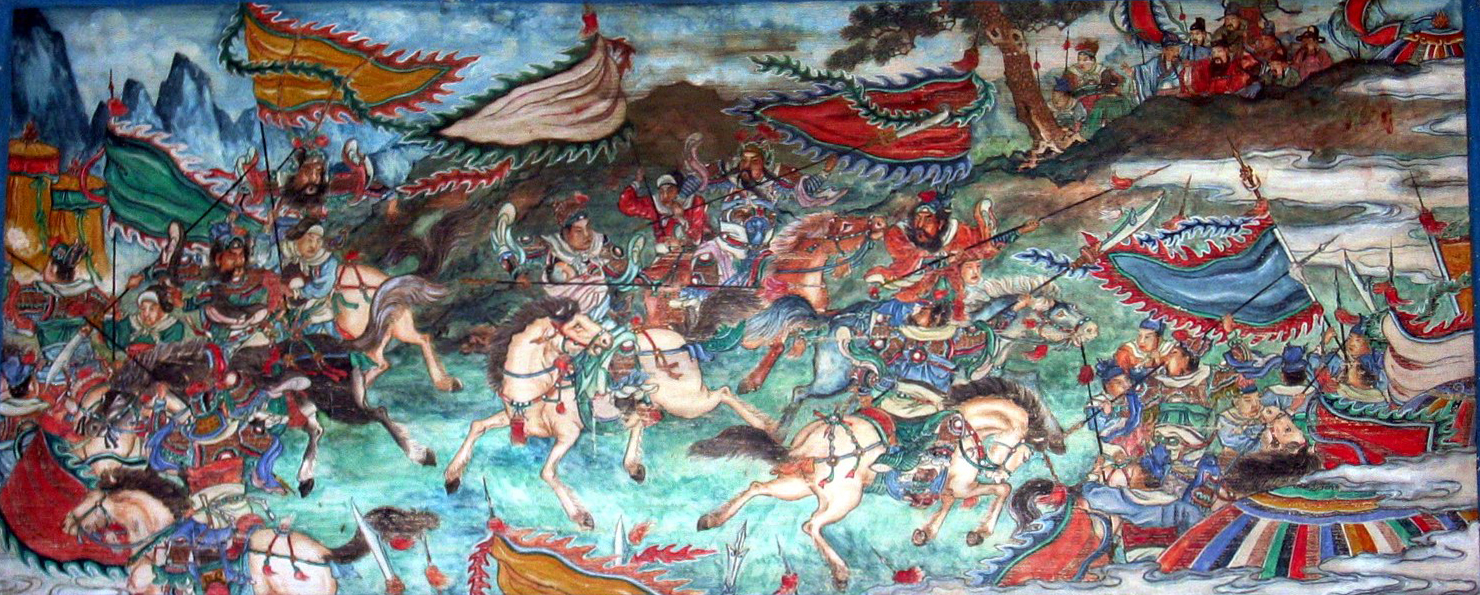
Zhao Yun's Fight at Changban

This painting shows another battle scene from The Romance of the Three Kingdom. In the Battle of Changban, the general Zhao Yun was severely outnumbered by the enemy army led by Cao Cao, whose son and future successor Cao Pi overthrew the Han dynasty royals and founded the Kingdom of Wei. In addition, Zhao Yun had to find the wife of Liu Bei, the founder of the Shu Han, and her child (Liu Shan). When he found them, Liu Bei's wife committed suicide in order not to be a burden on Zhao, who then went into battle protecting the child. The painting shows Zhao, dressed in white, surrounded by enemy soldiers and holding Liu Bei's son. In the end, he managed to inflict great harm on the enemy and save the child.

=== Lü Bu's Fight with Liu Bei, Guan Yu, and Zhang Fei ===
This painting is located on the western side of Qing Yao Pavilion. The subject is the Battle of Hulao Pass, once again a battle from the Romance of the Three Kingdoms novel. On one side of this battle stood Lü Bu, who was at the time loyal to his adoptive father Dong Zhuo, a tyrant who had gained control over the emperor of the Later Han dynasty. On the other side where the Three Sworn Brothers, Liu Bei, future founder of the Shu Han, Guan Yu, and Zhang Fei, two of his top generals and both counted among the Five Tiger Generals later in the novel. The painting shows Zhang Fei with a black face wielding a spear, Guan Yu with a red face and a guandao, and Liu Bei with a double-edged sword.
