= Ruan Ji =

Chinese musician and poet (210–263)

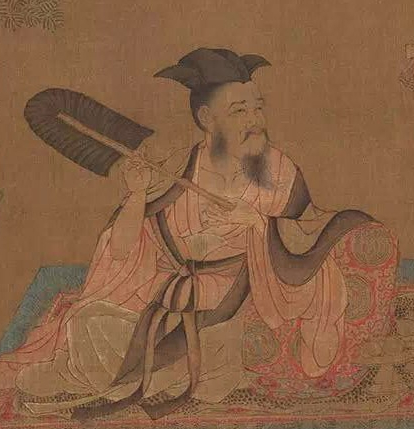
- Born: 210; Chenliu, Henan
- Died: 263 (aged 53)
- Occupations: Poet, musician

Ruan Ji
- Chinese: 阮籍
Transcriptions
Standard Mandarin
- Hanyu Pinyin: Ruǎn Jí
- Gwoyeu Romatzyh: Roan Jyi
- Wade–Giles: Juan^{3} Chi^{2}
- IPA: [ɻwàn tɕǐ]
Yue: Cantonese
- Yale Romanization: Yúhn Jihk
- Jyutping: Jyun5 Zik6
- IPA: [jyn˩˧ tsɪk̚˨]
Southern Min
- Tâi-lô: Ńg Tsi̍k (col.); Guán Tsi̍k (lit.)

Courtesy name
- Chinese: 嗣宗
Transcriptions
Standard Mandarin
- Hanyu Pinyin: Sìzōng

Ruan Ji (210–263), courtesy name Sizong, was a Chinese musician, poet, and military officer who lived in the late Eastern Han dynasty and Three Kingdoms period. He was one of the Seven Sages of the Bamboo Grove. The guqin melody Jiukuang (酒狂 'Drunken ecstasy', or 'Wine-mad') is believed to have been composed by him. At one time an infantry colonel, he was also known as Ruan Bubing (阮步兵; 'Ruan of the infantry').

== Life ==
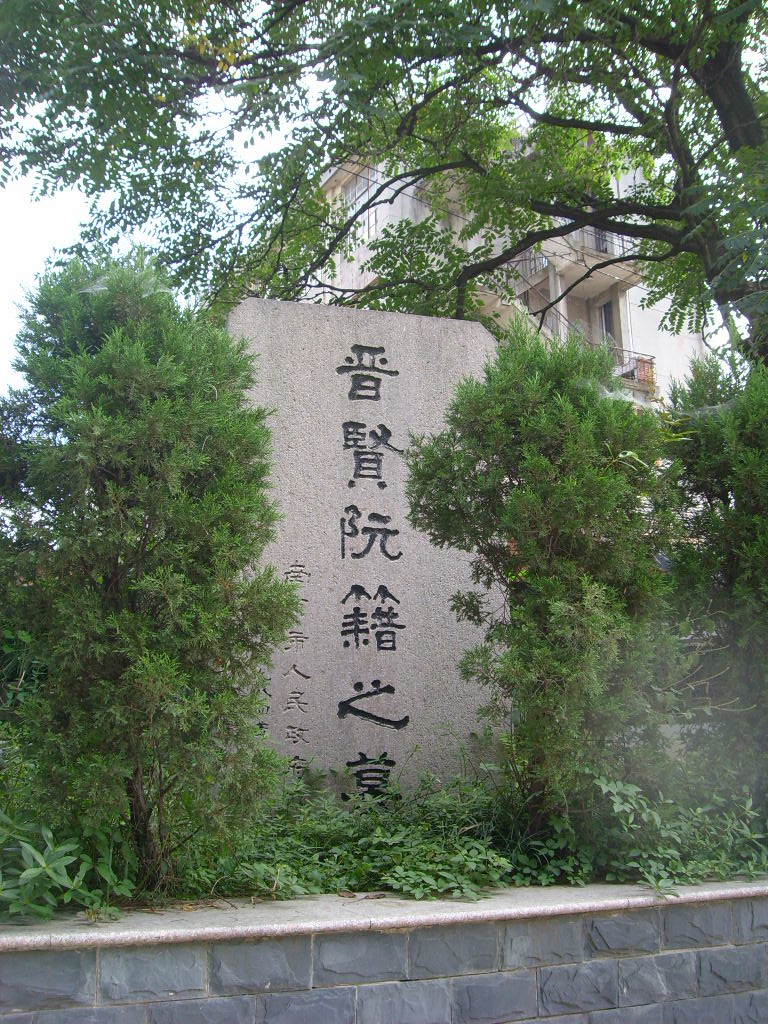
Memorial tombstone of Ruan Ji's life in Nanjing

Ruan Ji was born in Chenliu (in the southern part of modern-day Kaifeng, Henan). His father was Ruan Yu, one of the famed Seven Scholars of Jian'an who were promoted by the Cao clan in the Jian'an poetry era. The Ruan family were loyal to the Cao Wei, as opposed to the Sima family; however their moral convictions and willingness to speak out generally outmatched their actual military or political power. It is fair to say that Ruan Ji was born into peril, his time period being the Period of Disunity. Ruan Ji was poetically part of both the poetry of the Jian'an period and the beginning of the Six Dynasties poetry developments. He would embrace the poetic side of what the times offered him, and even managed to avoid many political dangers, turmoils, and snares of his time. The safety of Ruan Ji during his life seems to have been underwritten by his willingness to be labeled a drunk and an eccentric.

=== Rise of the Sima ===
Born just before the end of the Han dynasty, the Ruan family fortune rose with the rise of Cao Cao and the rest of the Cao family. However, while Ji was still quite young, the fortune of the Ruan family became imperiled with the rise of the Sima family: originally the Sima had merely served as officials under the Cao; but, as time went by they managed to accrue more and more power into their own family's hands, particularly beginning with Sima Yi this process of growth of power would eventually culminate in the founding of the Jin dynasty (266–420) by Sima Yan. Furthermore, during the time of Ruan Ji, there was ongoing peril from the ongoing military struggles with the kingdom of Shu Han, together with other impending military and political changes.

== Sociocultural background ==
=== Politics and the poet ===
The life and creative work of Ruan Ji took place within a crucial and dramatic period in China history, which was associated with large changes in various spheres of life. The Han dynasty had seen a period of virtuous rule in which the norm of ritual piety, philanthropic principles of legendary ancient rulers, aspiration to nurture officials – calm, reasonable, serving for consciousness, not of fear – became governmental norm. However this was followed by the so-called Period of Disunity.

Ruan Ji witnessed bloody wars, struggles for power in the court of Wei, and the Sima family's rise. Despite the dim times, this was a period of great achievements in spiritual culture. Bright peculiarity of that time was intellectual life: interests in metaphysics, which were discussed in the "pure talks" of open academic forums, profound interest in the problem of the highest purpose, the great popularity of Daoism and the spreading of foreign learning, such as Buddhism, a rapid expansion of lyrical poetry, a flourishing of all fine arts from painting to architecture; all these brought a spirit of "grace and freedom" (Feng Youlan) to the epoch.

The invention of cheap paper in the 2nd century spread literacy among a large population, which brought a sense of chivalry (shi 士) to a large number of educated people, with notions of good, truth, justice and virtue. Heroes of the day became irreproachable virtuous men, who relinquished politics and preferred a quiet life in the countryside or the life of a hermit to the glamour and fame of court life. These so-called sublime men (junzi 君子) brought into being ideas of protest against an iniquitous reign, hidden by exterior unconcern, and greatness in undemanding and pureness. The life of court officials was considered "the life of dust and dirt", while the real dirt of peasant labour was a symbol of purity.

=== The Bamboo Grove ===
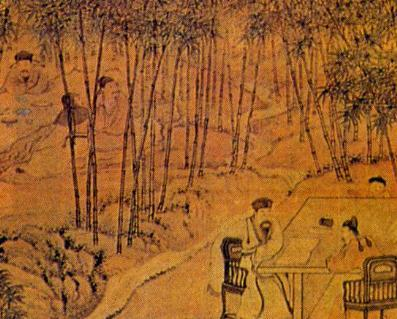

As is traditionally depicted, a certain group of seven scholar/musician/poets wishing to escape the intrigues, corruption and stifling atmosphere of court life during the politically fraught Three Kingdoms period of Chinese history habitually gathered in the obscurity of a bamboo grove near the house of Xi Kang (aka Ji Kang) in Shanyang (now in Henan province). Here they enjoyed practicing their works, and enjoying the simple, rustic life, always with much Chinese alcoholic beverage (sometimes referred to as "wine").

Livia Kohn describes Ruan Ji's artistic expression,

His friends and fellow poets induced ecstatic experiences through music, wine, and drugs, especially the notorious Cold Food Powder which created psychedelic states and made the body feel very hot, causing people to take off their clothes and jump into pools. When back in their ordinary selves, they wrote poetry of freedom and escape, applying the Zhuangzi concept of free and easy wandering in the sense of getting away from it all and continuing the text's tradition in their desperate search for a better world within.

This was contrasted with the theoretically and Confucian certified honorable and joyful duty of serving ones country; but, which at this time would have actually meant living (at least briefly) a life of attempting to perform governmental service amid the deadly dangerous political quagmires of the seats of power and changes of government. Rather than attempt to stay loyal to Wei through the rise of Jin by their active, personal involvement, the Seven Sages of the Bamboo Grove instead stressed the enjoyment of ale, personal freedom, spontaneity and a celebration of nature—together with political avoidance.

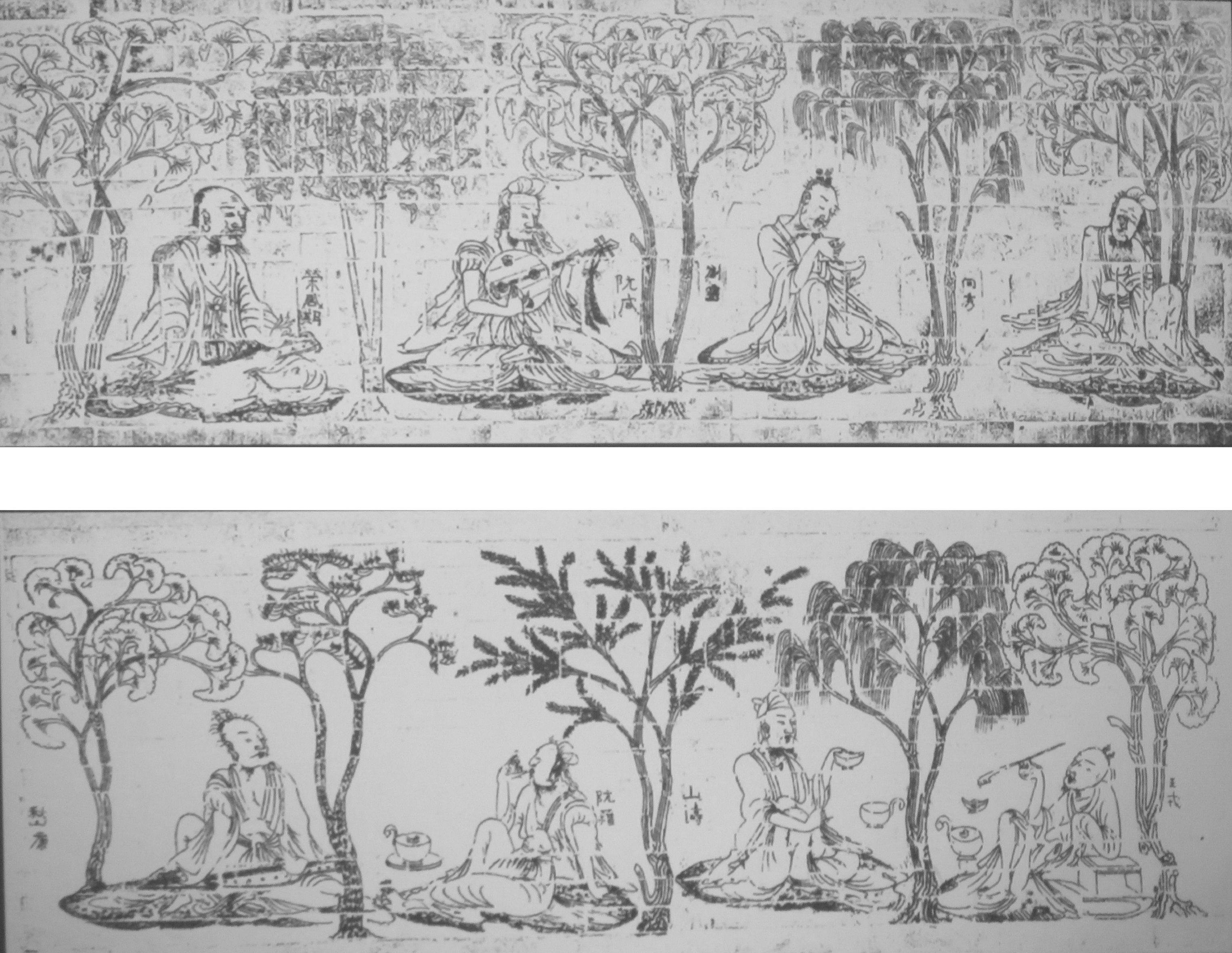
"Seven Sages of the Bamboo Grove", Shaanxi Provincial Museum

Ruan Ji is usually mentioned first among the Seven Sages of the Bamboo Grove. The other sages were Xi Kang his lover, Shan Tao (山濤), Liu Ling (劉伶), Ruan Xian (阮咸), Xiang Xiu (向秀), Wang Rong (王戎). They created an image of wise men enjoying life rather uninhibitedly, realizing the old dream of a Daoist concord of free men who are gifted with hidden wisdom "to be together, not being together" and "act jointly, not acting jointly". The wine goblet, which became a symbol of being accustomed to "contemplating many wonders" pertaining to Daoism, united them even more than any principles. Ruan Ji talked in his works about "remote" things but about the "Bamboo Groove" he remained silent, although the group became the main focus of his searches for free and frank friendship.

== Anecdotes ==
Ruan Ji was one of that kind of people, who themselves made their life a masterpiece. In the Chen Shou's History of Wei Dynasty the mentioning of Ruan Ji was more than modest: "... highly talented, having an ability to avoid the chains of court morality and traditions, but unbalanced and undisciplined; he was eager to banish his temptations. Ruan Ji honoured the ancient Daoist sage Zhuangzi." The History of Jin Dynasty describes Ruan Ji's appearance and personality: "Ji's appearance was uncommon, stubborn and self-willed, tempered, proud and independent. Following only the gusts of soul ... Sometimes he would wander away on the hills and forget to return, and at length come back crying bitterly; at other times he would shut himself up with his books and see no one for months. He read a lot, especially liking Laozi and Zhuangzi. He drank a lot, he possessed the skill of transcendental whistling and loved to play on the qin (琴). Once inspired by an idea, he forgot about everything in the world. Many considered him to be a madman."

Fu Yi, who describes Ruan Ji as a connoisseur of ancient essays, mentioned that the "poet was diligently engaged in sciences" and read books until nightfall. This quiet solitude and obsession in perceiving the knowledge of the ancients was his hidden source of inspiration. Ruan Ji widely opened the way to court honour but he never hid his despise of the careerist attitudes of officials. One of his biographers told: "initially Ji tried to improve the world, but lived on the Wei and Jin boundary. In China there were few Junzi who preserved themselves. Because of that Ji abandoned his affairs, and was intoxicated all the time."

One day at the court, on being told about a son who had killed his mother, Ruan Ji said: "Ha! If he has gone so far to kill his mother, he could allow himself to kill his father too." All, who heard this, "lost their gift of talking" and demanded him to explain himself, because "the killing of father is the worst crime in the Empire, how could you say that it is possible?" Ruan Ji replied: "Animals and birds know their mother, but are unaware of the father. Killing father – is becoming like animals and birds, but those who killed their own mother – are even worse than animals." Chronicler added: "No one could object his words."

Ruan Ji refused the rules not only in court. There is a story telling about him playing chess when he received news about the death of his mother. His chess partner asked him to end the game, but Ruan Ji cold-bloodedly finished the game, then drank two measures of wine and started to groan. On the funeral he wept so violently, that he brought up several pints of blood. He didn't mourn and, despite observing the decencies, ate meat and drank wine. Yet when people came to support him, he showed to all but a favored few only the whites of his eyes. When Ji Kang (嵇康, 223–262) came along carrying with him a jar of wine and the musical instrument known as a Qin, Ruan Ji welcomed him with his pupils and met him with happiness.

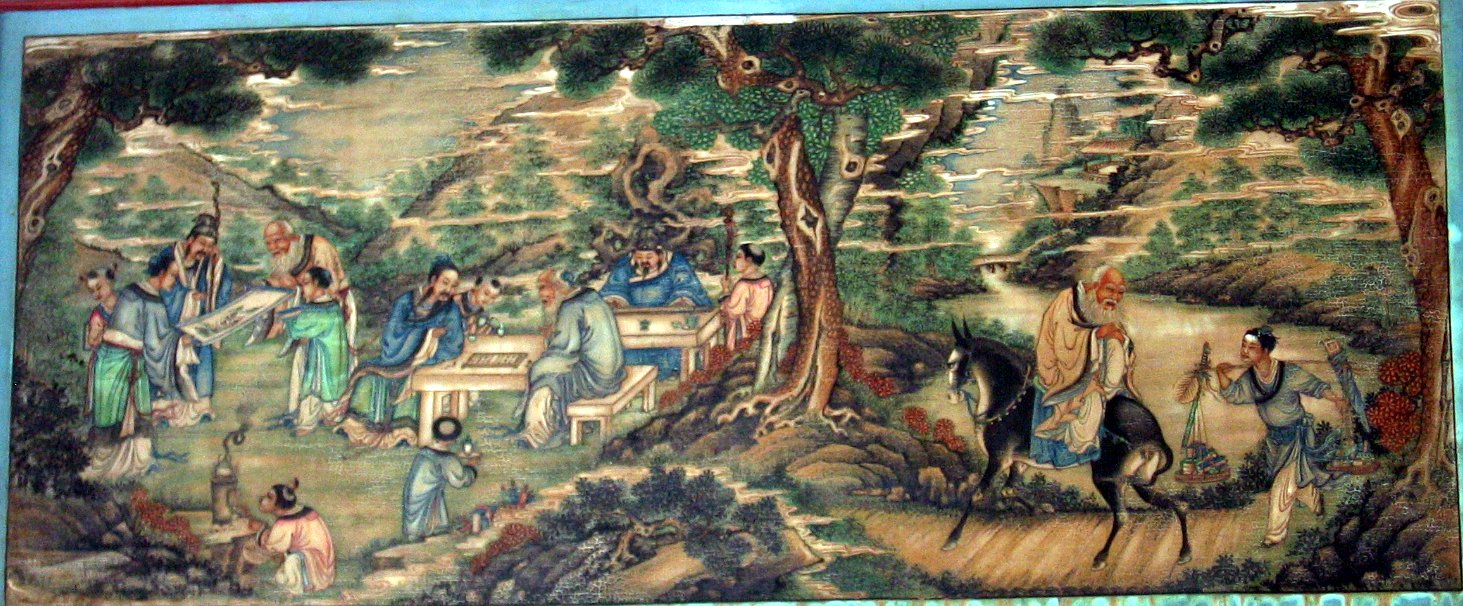
Seven saints in the bamboo wood

In Chinese traditional thinking there exists three opinions on Ruan Ji. The first opinion – wholly negative – claims him to be an inspirer of vicious "dissoluteness". The second considers him a wielder of "disturbance". Zhen Yu wrote: "Many consider Ruan Ji to be a dissolute, unrestrained man, but it is an insufficient opinion ... He was not talking about the imperfection of others, looked only with the whites of his eyes. Is this not an address to the world of mankind? In mourning he ate meat and drank wine, groaned and spat out blood – isn't it a care of man's Dao (way)? At that time reigning powers were cruel ... but Ruan Ji died a natural death – isn't it a wisdom of self preservation?" The third opinion sees Ruan Ji as a wise man, one who penetrated in the hidden "Dao Art". Cui ShuLiang wrote about him: "Ruan Ji stood up above all the mankind", was "out of validity and invalidity", none were able to "achieve his greatness, and measure the depth of his thoughts", he became "refined begin of all matters". The poet Wang Ji praised him as the first man, after legendary rulers of ancient times, who found the way to paradise of universal, careless intoxication.

One of Ruan Ji's poems expresses how he discarded the norms of Confucius, although they were followed by such virtuous men like Yan Yuan and Min Sun, who were students of Confucius. He obtains wisdom from the legendary Daoist Xian Menzi. Talking about the changes in the poet ideals, we can remember a statement, "Are there any rituals for man like I am?"

== Work ==
Ruan Ji's work reveals different sides of his inner world.

=== Essays ===
"About Penetration into the Book of Changes" is a philosophical essay. "About Music" expresses ideas on the nature of a world order. Other works are "About Penetration into Laozi" and "About Understanding Zhuangzi". Ruan Ji achieved the most fame with his almanac Poems from My Heart, which contains 82 poems. His contemporaries said of Ruan Ji's work "The Life of a Great Man" that it revealed all his innermost thoughts. The main character of the work is a nameless hermit, whose characteristics are described at the beginning of the essay:

Ten thousands li (里) were for him as one step, thousands of years as one morning. He pursued nothing, stopped on nothing; he was in search of the Great Dao, and found shelter nowhere ... Egoists scold and abuse him, ignoramuses reproach him, but no one knew the refined wanderings of his spirit. But the old man didn't betray his pursuit, despite being the bewilderment of a society that abused him ...

By means of this wise man, Ruan Ji reveals his own innermost ideas. In his composition, Ruan Ji ridicules Confucian morals and rituals.

With the appearance of a ruler cruelty flourished instantaneously, vassals came into being and at once faithlessness and betrayal appeared. Rituals and laws are established but people are bound, not free. Cheating the ignorant, duping simple people, hiding knowledge to seem wise. The powerful ones are ruling and causing outrage, the weak ones are afraid and subservient to others. They seem disinterested, but in fact they are grasping. On the inside they are insidious, but on the outside they are amiable and polite. If made a crime – don't regret, if you got luck – don't enjoy ...

The world view of Ruan Ji mostly refers to Daoist tradition, but that doesn't mean that he was a Daoist. He took from the Daoist philosophers of old what he thought important; in essence, he looked for "truth inside himself". He concerned himself not merely with knowing the truth, but looking for good and truth inside a cruel and imperfect world, mainly looking for a connection between man and the world.

=== Poetry ===
Ruan Ji had a many-sided personality, but poetry brought him the glory and fame of being the greatest poet of his epoch. Liu Se gave a classical evaluation to the place of poetry in the life of Ruan Ji. Comparing two geniuses of the 3rd century, Ji Kang and Ruan Ji, he wrote: "Ji Kang expressed in his compositions the intellect of an outstanding thinker, Ruan Ji put all his spirit and all his life into his poems. Their voices are different, but they sound in full harmony! Their wings are not similar, but they are flying in absolute unity!" Zhong Rong in his work The Categories of Poems ascribes Ruan Ji's work to the highest rank of poetry: "... his poetry can strengthen one's temper and spirit, it can cast a deep thoughtful mood ... but the meaning of his poetry is hard for understanding." Mikuchi Fukanaga sees in Ruan Ji's poetry a unique attempt to explain the experience called satori in Japanese Buddhism.

The poetry of Ruan Ji has the same mood, what differs is his soul and his world view. In it we can find biting and angry criticism of Confucian dogmatists and rulers, a glorification of the gladness of "carefree wandering", and the anger and sorrow resulting from the conflict between Junzi (君子) and "times of chaos". It differs by a particular broad view of the world, being exceptionally lyric, in which he says only about himself. His poetry mixes thoughts, moods and feelings. Ruan Ji often uses contrast to underline the beauty of a moment that is always neighbouring the irresistible "emptiness" of death. For example, he often used an image of bright flowers that blossom on old graves.

Bushes of flowers
Leafy blooming on graves...
(translated by Aleksey Pashkovsky)

Ruan Ji preferred not to use concrete characters — a hero, a hermit, a Confucian, a saint man, a sage — using examples from ancestors. And for geographical references he used ancient names.

His poems confront illusory life and tensity of every day matters, glory of a hero and solitude of a hermit, love's passion and the inevitability of separation. All the lyrical poetry of Ruan Ji is penetrated by a thought of sorrow, which he accepted as an eternal and unavoidable friend, near him throughout life. He wrote: "Only with sorrow thoughts are occurring, without sorrow there is no thoughtful mood ..." The first poem of his almanac Singing My Cares (咏懷 Yǒnghuái) expresses such sad thoughts.

Being sleepless at midnight,
I rise to play lute.
The moon is visible through the curtains
And a gentle breeze sways the cords of my robe.
A lonely wild goose cries in the wilderness
And is echoed by birds in the woods.
As it circles, it gazes
At me, alone, imbued with sadness.
(translated by Jerome Ch'en & Michael Bullock)

Here the author recreated a particular background for his constant sorrow: the night's haze, moonlight, a slight gentle breeze, voices of invisible birds. Such a sad mood appears in almost all the poems in his almanac. He doesn't always hide his feelings behind nature; sometimes his voice breaks away to shout and one can hear confusion and fear: "I loose my way, what will be with me now?"

=== Music ===
"Jiu Kuang" 《酒狂》 "Drunken Ecstasy"
From the Shenqi Mipu 【神竒秘譜】 (1425). Adapted and transcribed by Charlie Huang in 4/4 rhythm.

The China of the 3rd century saw an overall interest in music. Music in China was a matter of national importance. The Qin ( 琴) and the flute received the same importance as the brush for writing or living language. For Ruan Ji music meant an ideal of harmony. Ruan Ji perceived music not in sounds but in the world, music that is inherent to the world. He linked music with the "natural way" (道). Ruan Ji didn't like music to cast non-constant feelings, even sorrow or joy, especially if man feels the pleasure of his emotional experience. Ruan Ji explained his understanding of music with the example of an episode from Confucius' life: "Once, Confucius, in a state of Qi, heard ancient music and then for three months he didn't know the taste of meat. That means", Ruan Ji explained, "that perfect music doesn't arouse desires. The heart is serene, the spirit is placid, and then the taste of meat is unknown." From this point of view the music of ancient, wise men is merely the expression of harmony.

Ruan Ji said about himself in the following words:

In a forest lives one rare bird.
She calls herself fairy bird feng.
At the bright morning she drinks from pure springs.
At the evening she flies away to the pikes of far mountains.
Her hoot reaches remote lands.
By straining neck, she sees all eight deserts.
She rushes together with autumn wind,
Strong wings putting together,
She will blow away to west to Kunlun Mountains,
When she will be back?
But she hates all kind of places and titles,
Her heart is tormented by sorrow and anguish.
(translated by Aleksey Pashkovsky)

And of his life he stated: "Only one moment – but how much sorrow is hidden!" At this "moment of sorrow" he found immortality.
