= Rong Qiqi =

Chinese folk hero

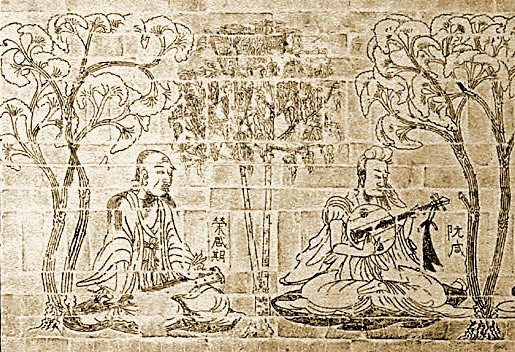
A part of molded-brick relief, found from an Eastern Jin or Southern dynasties tomb near Nanjing, which depicts Rong Qiqi (left) with Ruan Xian (right), one of the Seven Sages of the Bamboo Grove

Róng Qǐqī (simplified Chinese: 荣启期; traditional Chinese: 榮啟期; pinyin: Róng Qǐqī) is a mythological Chinese folk hero. He is depicted as a recluse, who shuns material possessions in favour of an ascetic life. Rong was known in ancient China for a fable involving an alleged encounter with the philosopher Confucius. Although largely forgotten in the centuries that followed, the story of his encounter with Confucius later became a source of artistic and poetic inspiration beginning in the later Six Dynasties era. The story is retold in the famous text Liezi, supposedly written by Lie Yukou, a circa 5th-century BCE Hundred Schools of Thought philosopher. Many scholars conclude that Rong Qiqi, while a notable figure in early Chinese literature, is likely fictional or legendary and not historical.

== Biography ==
Like many folk heroes, it is uncertain if Rong Qiqi is a fictional character, or if his story has some basis in truth.

According to the fable involving Rong, he lived to the age of 95. The text does not indicate the cause of Rong's predicament, whether it arose out of choice or from misfortune, but popular interpretations of the text have assumed it is the former.

== Encounter with Confucius ==
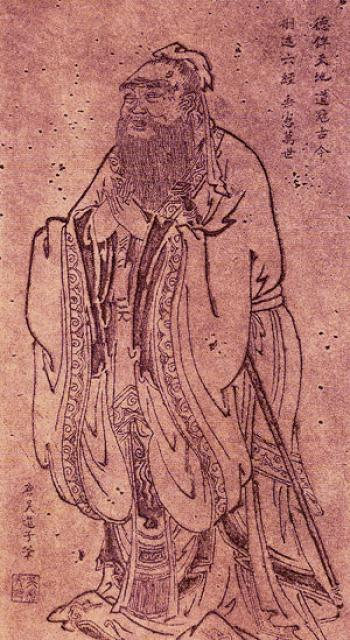
A portrait of Confucius, by Tang dynasty artist Wu Daozi (680–740).

Confucius was a famous philosopher in Ancient China, known for his emphasis on filial piety and on the importance of education and studying. This makes him a perfect foil for Rong Qiqi, who rejects his personal responsibilities in favour of pursuing happiness. In the story, Confucius encounters Rong Qiqi, an elderly recluse who has chosen a life of asceticism. Rong is starkly in contrast to the Confucian ideal of a successful man; he is elderly, poorly dressed, with little material possessions or ambitions. And yet, despite his poverty, Rong appears happy to Confucius. He responds to Confucius' bewilderment with a cheerful song, happily accompanied by his playing of what may be translated as "lute" (but was actually the qin). The Han dynasty classic Huainanzi reports that "when Rong Qiqi plucks one chord of his lute, Confucius, moved by its harmony, rejoiced for three days."

Confucius requests Rong provide reasons for his happiness. Rong Qiqi, Confucius surmised, has nothing to be joyful of; he has no possessions, no hope, and no future. Rong replies that he is happy for three reasons, his "three joys" (simplified Chinese: 三乐图; traditional Chinese: 三樂圖; pinyin: Sān lètú): being born human, being born a man, and living to an old age. That, for him, is enough.

After all, Rong surmises, most men are poor and all men will die, so why should he worry himself? This is consistent with all lives, so instead of waiting with everyone else for it to eventually end, why should he worry himself with anything? Why should he deny himself happiness? Instead of being miserable, waiting for his fate, he chooses to be happy. Says Rong Qiqi:

For humans, a life of hardship is the norm and death is the end. Abiding by the norm, awaiting my end, what is there to be concerned about?

== Appeal ==
Rong Qiqi's appeal was his complete abstinence of material desires. He was similar to his Western counterpart, Diogenes the Cynic, in rejecting all societal norms and physical comforts for a life of ascetic virtue.

He lived in poverty, not because he was forced to, but because he chose to. He chose to reject the material world. Being destitute was, by itself, not an appealing trait.

=== In literature and art ===
The philosophy of the possibly fictional Rong Qiqi was widely admired among writers, with artists viewing it at as a more natural, more fluid, more liberating way to live life. The poet Ruan Kan wrote approvingly of Rong, applauding Rong Qiqi's fatalistic view of life as a way to achieve the tranquility and harmony valued in Daoism as integral to the Dao.

Poets Gu Kaizhi and Tao Yuanming both mentioned Rong Qiqi in their poetry. Tao spoke of Rong with some skepticism, wondering if such emphasis on nature and abandonment of the worldly is actually worth it. In fact, in the second of his "Drinking Wine" series of poems, Tao Yuanming questions what is the worth of living a virtuous life, if this means having to choose poverty, in order to do so? Tao uses the examples of Boyi and Shuqi (who starved to death for their ideals) and of Rong Qiqi; mentioning in this poem, that in his ninetieth decade of life, Rong was using a mere rope for a belt. Tao answers his own question:

Were it not for those individuals who chose poverty so as to preserve their integrity,
What in history would be worth passing down to future generations?

Some poets rejected Rong, seeing seclusion as a cheap escape from recent misfortune and responsibility. The poet Sengdu, while praising the idea of seclusion as a means of spiritual enlightenment, rejected Rong's reaction to futility by indulging in simplistic joys and desire. As he describes in one of his poems, Sendu's response to Rong is "Though this age might be said to be joyous, what of later lives?"

Rong Qiqi was also popularly associated with a group of Chinese Taoist Qingtan scholars, writers, and musicians called the Seven Sages of the Bamboo Grove who came together in the 3rd century CE. This is indicated in some apocryphal art from the 4th century CE, in a tomb near Nanjing, depicting Rong Qiqi with the Seven Sages. However, the Seven Sages lived in a time period long after Rong Qiqi's, so this association apocryphally assumes that Rong Qiqi as a real person.

== See also ==
- Diogenes
- Fatalism
- Hedonism
