= Seven Sages of the Bamboo Grove =

3rd century group of Chinese scholars, writers and musicians

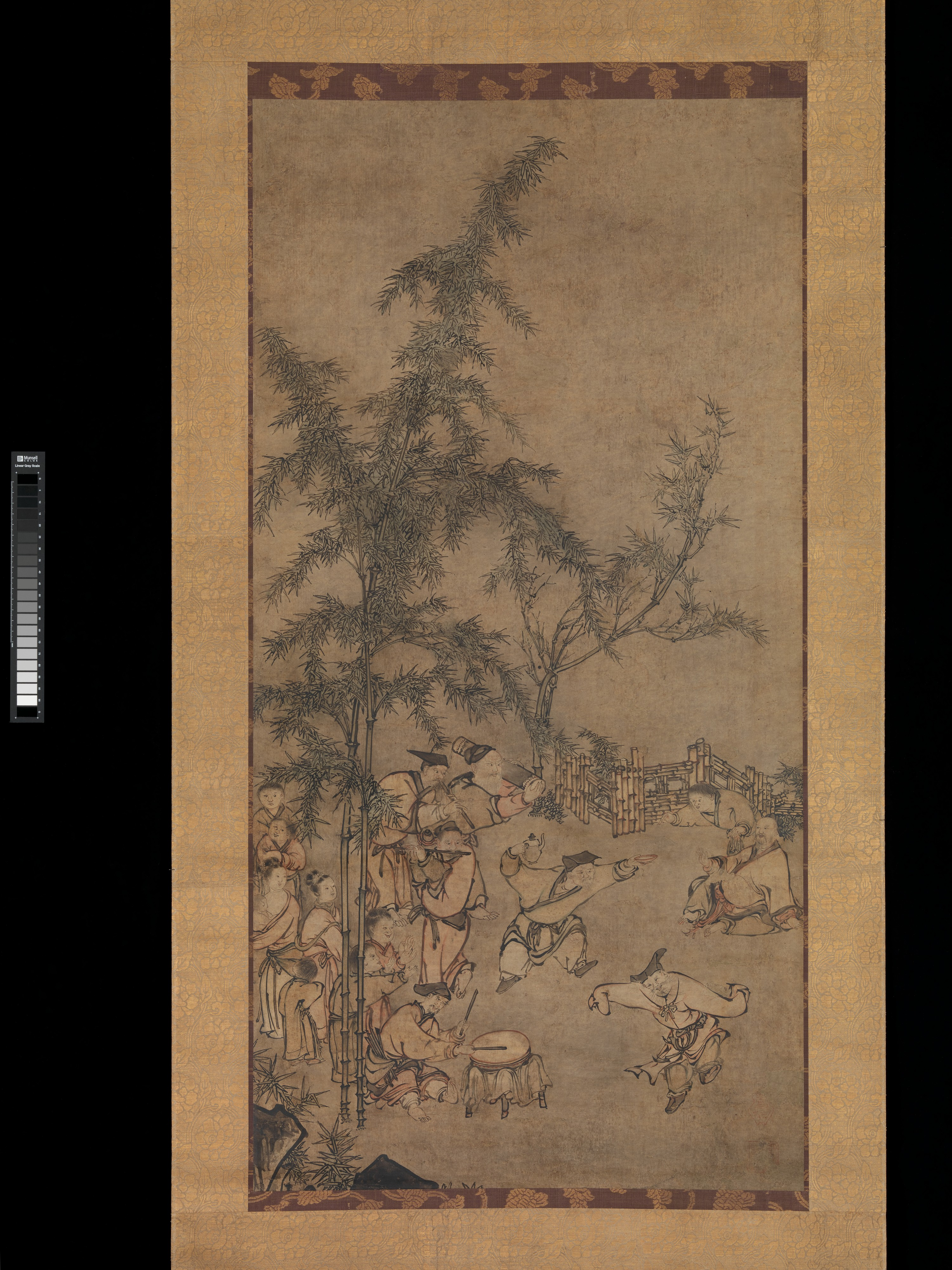
16th-century depiction by Sesson Shukei

The Seven Sages of the Bamboo Grove (also known as the Seven Worthies of the Bamboo Grove, traditional Chinese: 竹林七賢; simplified Chinese: 竹林七贤; pinyin: Zhúlín Qī Xián; Pe̍h-ōe-jī: Tiok-lîm Chhit Hiân) were a group of Chinese scholars, writers, and musicians of the third century CE. Although the various individuals all existed, their interconnection is not entirely certain. Several of the seven were linked with the Qingtan school of Daoism as it existed in the state of Cao Wei.

The Seven Sages found their lives to be in danger when the avowedly "Confucian" Jin dynasty of the Sima clan came to power. Among other things, some of the seven wrote poems criticizing the court and the administration, and wrote Daoist-influenced literature. Not all seven sages had similar views. Some of the seven tried to negotiate their way through the difficult political positions by self-consciously adopting the roles of alcohol-fueled pranksters and eccentrics avoiding government control (for example, Liu Ling), yet some ended up joining the Jin dynasty (for example Wang Rong). However much they may or may not have been personally engaged in "witty conversation or debates" (qingtan), they became the subjects of it themselves in the A New Account of the Tales of the World (Chinese: 世說新語; pinyin: Shìshuō Xīnyǔ).

== The Seven Sages ==
The Seven Sages are Ji Kang (嵇康) (aka Xi Kang), Liu Ling (刘伶), Ruan Ji (阮籍), Ruan Xian (阮咸), Xiang Xiu (向秀), Wang Rong (王戎) and Shan Tao (山涛). Ji Kang was especially close to Ruan Ji; their relationship was described as "stronger than metal and fragrant as orchids". The wife of Shan Tao was said to be impressed by Ruan Ji and Ji Kang's prowess when she spied on them during sexual intercourse.

As it is traditionally depicted, the group wished to escape the intrigues, corruption and stifling atmosphere of court life during the politically fraught Three Kingdoms period of Chinese history. They gathered in a bamboo grove near the house of Ji Kang in Shanyang (now in Henan province) where they enjoyed, and praised in their works, the simple, rustic life. This was contrasted with the politics of court. The Seven Sages stressed the enjoyment of alcoholic beverages, cold-food powder, personal freedom, spontaneity and a celebration of nature.

It would be Ji Kang's refusal to work for the new regime of Sima Zhao which would eventually lead to his execution. The group's rural life became a common theme for art, and they inspired other artists who wished to retreat during times of political upheavals.

Another person associated with the Seven Sages is Rong Qiqi (榮啟期), who in fact lived quite earlier. This association is depicted in some apocryphal art from the fourth century CE, in a tomb near Nanjing.

The Seven Sages, or the symbol that they became, have been remarked to be influential in Chinese poetry, music, art, and overall culture.

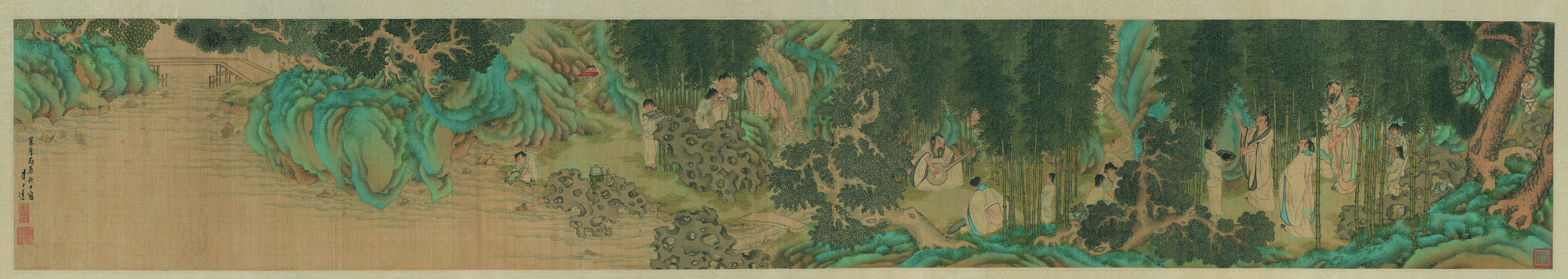
The Seven Worthies of the Bamboo Grove (1616) by Li Shida of the Chinese Ming dynasty

== Gallery ==
The Seven Sages of the Bamboo Grove have inspired not only generations of poets, but also painters and other artists.

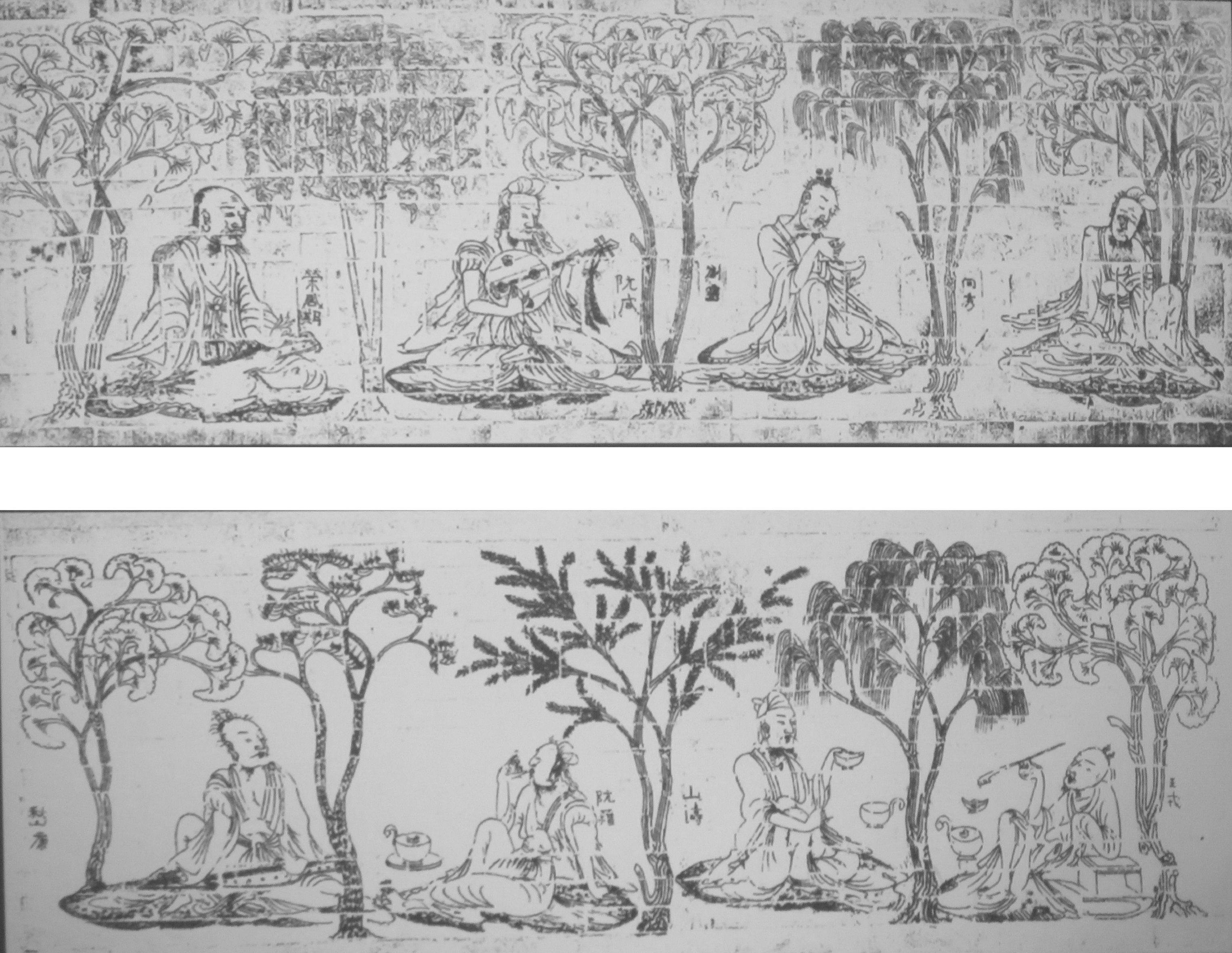
Seven Sages of the Bamboo Grove (with the addition of an anachronistic or immortal Rong Qiqi). From rubbing of Eastern Jin molded tomb bricks.

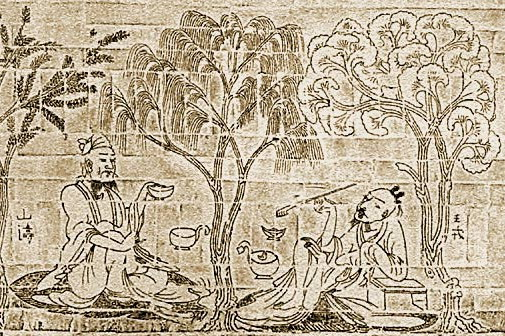
Details of the molded-brick relief "Seven Sages of the Bamboo Grove and Rong Qiqi", found from an Eastern Jin or Southern dynasties tomb near Nanjing, which depicts Shan Tao (left) and Wang Rong (right).

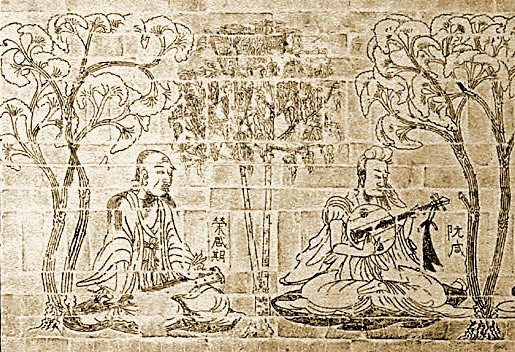
Details of the molded-brick relief "Seven Sages of the Bamboo Grove and Rong Qiqi", found from an Eastern Jin or Southern dynasties tomb near Nanjing, which depicts Rong Qiqi (left) and Ruan Xian (right).

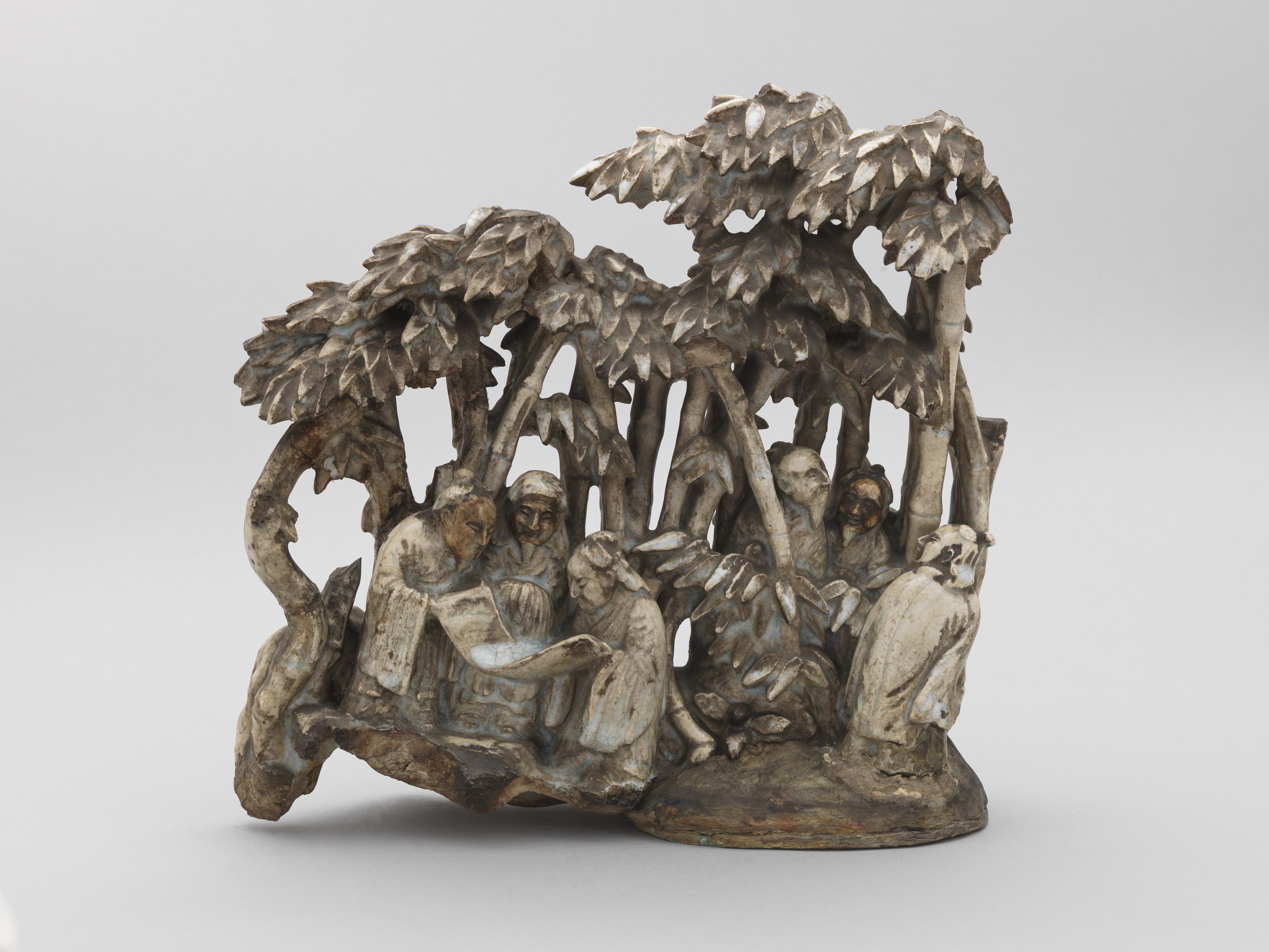
The Seven Sages of the Bamboo Grove, porcelain figurine from the Ming dynasty era (1368–1644). Musée Cernuschi

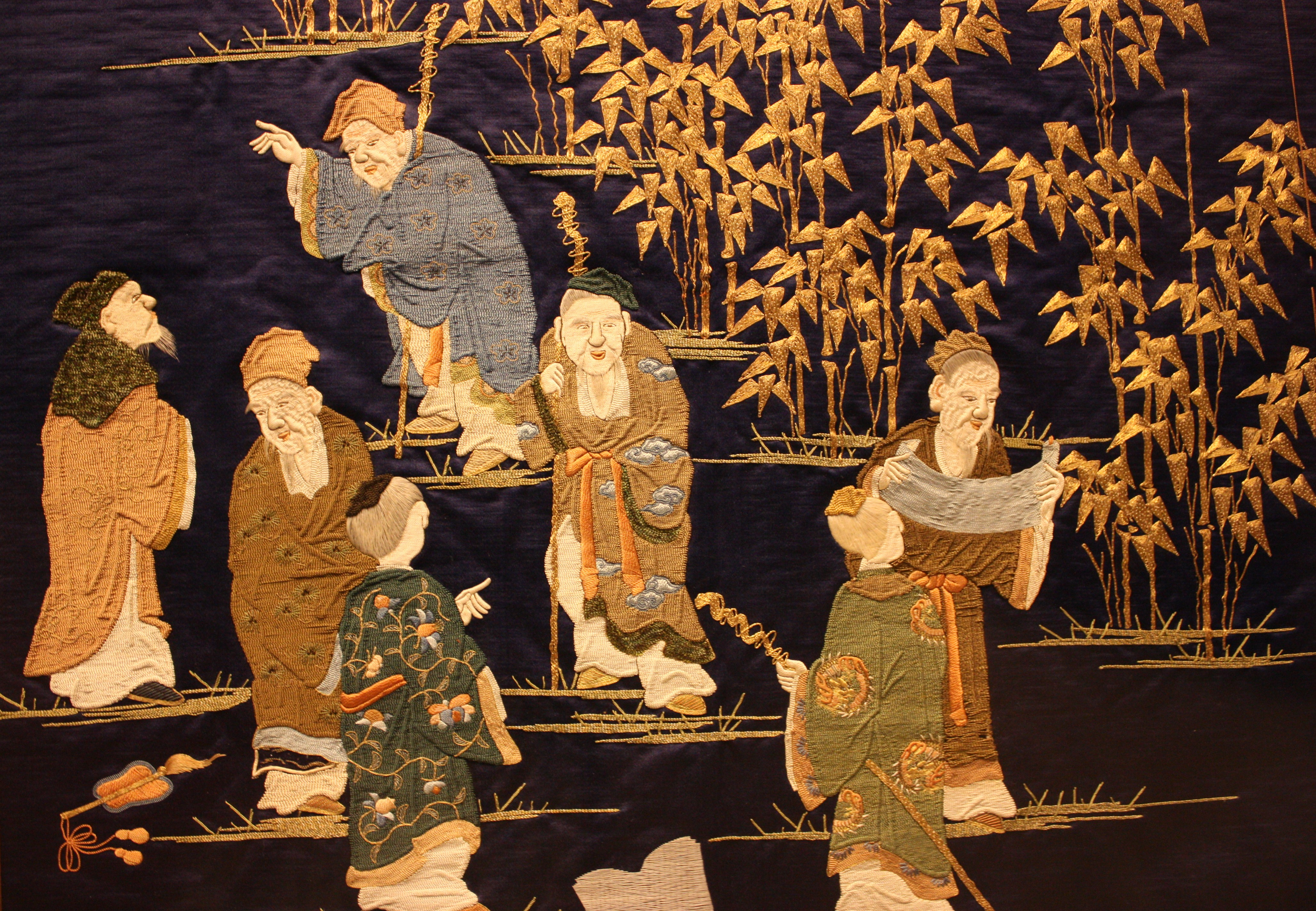
The Seven Sages of the Bamboo Grove embroidered on dark blue satin woven silk, 1860–1880.

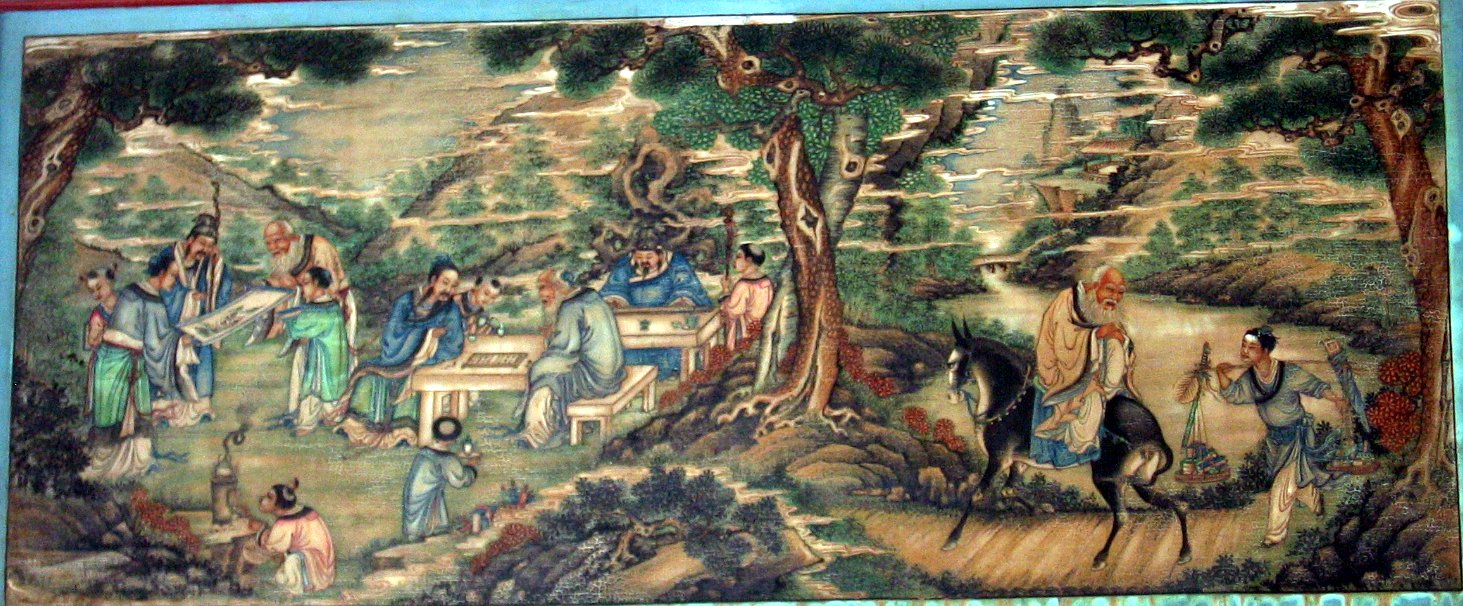
"The Seven Saints in the Bamboo Wood" painted inside the Long Corridor on the grounds of the Summer Palace in Beijing, China.

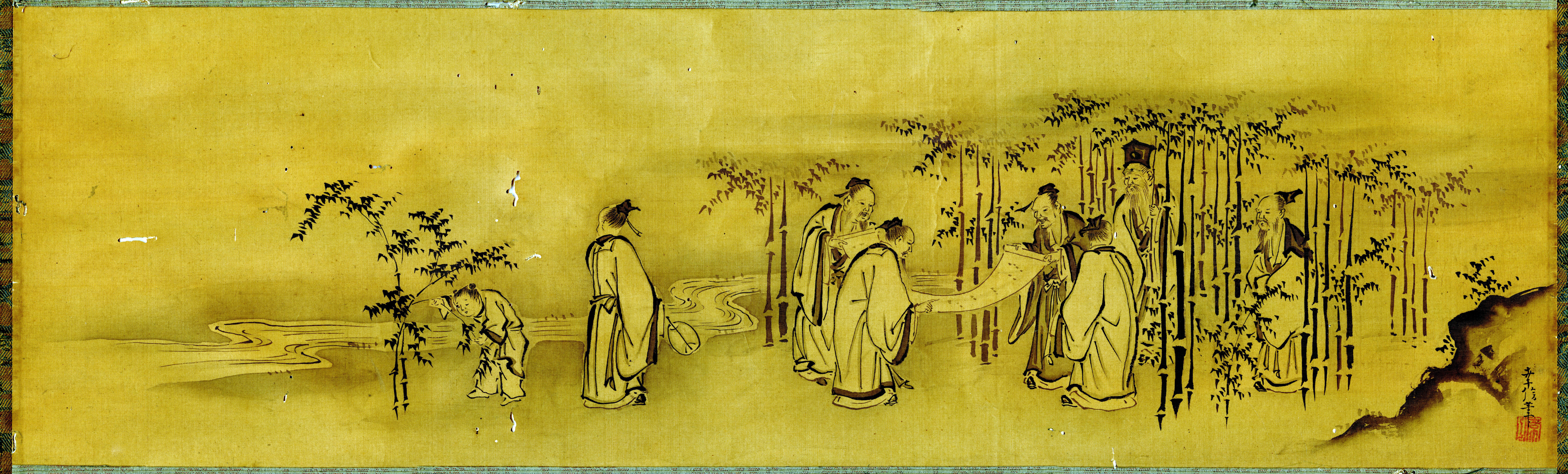
The Seven Sages of the Bamboo Grove (with a boy attendant), in a Kano school Japanese painting of the Edo period

== See also ==
- Seven Scholars of Jian'an
- Six Dynasties poetry
