= Shan Tao (Taoist) =

One of the Seven Sages of the Bamboo Grove (205-283)

Shan Tao 山濤
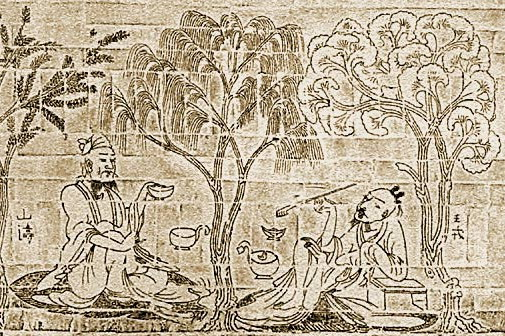
- Shan Tao (left) with Wang Rong, in a relief dating from the 4th century

Personal details
- Born: 205 Wuzhi County, Henan
- Died: 3 March 283 (aged 78)
- Children: Shan Gai; Shan Chun; Shan Yun; Shan Mo; Shan Jian
- Courtesy name: Juyuan (巨源)

Shan Tao (Chinese: 山濤; pinyin: Shan Tao; 205 – 3 March 283), courtesy name Juyuan, posthumously known as Count Kang of Xinta (新沓康伯), (Note: Yu Yu's (brother of Yu Xi) Jin Shu (cited as an annotation in vol.03 of Shishuo Xinyu) recorded that Shan was posthumously made a marquis. Thus, his posthumous title was "Marquis Kang" (康侯).) was one of the Seven Sages of the Bamboo Grove, a group of Chinese Taoist scholars, writers and musicians who lived in the 3rd century. Shan also was an official of Cao Wei and Western Jin.

== Background ==
Shan Tao's father Shan Yao was a minor official. Zhang Chunhua's mother was a grandaunt of Shan Tao's.

== Life under Cao Wei ==
In c.244, Shan Tao joined the Wei bureaucracy, when he was 40 (by East Asian age reckoning). After several minor positions, he was nominated as a xiaolian.

During one night in c.247, Shan Tao was with Shi Jian (石鉴) (Note: not the same person as the Later Zhao emperor). While they were resting, Shan suddenly kicked Shi and exclaimed, "Why are you sleeping so soundly at a time like this? Don't you know what the Grand Tutor is up to?" Shi replied, "The Prime Minister has great power and has the law with him. What are you worried about?" Shan then retorted "Ah! Master Shi should not be traveling around!" (Note: Qing-era poet Wen Tingshi (文廷式) later adapted this line in a poem (浣溪沙·旅情) and credited Shan Tao in his annotation (“用山巨源语”。).) Less than two years later, the Incident at the Gaoping Tombs occurred, and Shan Tao became a hermit again.

After the Incident at the Gaoping Tombs, the Sima clan under Sima Yi began to tighten its control over Cao Wei. After Sima Yi's death in September 251, his eldest son Sima Shi took over as regent of Cao Wei. It was during Sima Shi's tenure as regent that one day, Shan Tao went to visit Shi as a relative. Sima Shi said to him, "Does Lü Wang want a government position?" Shi then ordered that Shan be nominated as a xiucai and given the minor position of langzhong. Later, Shan went to serve under Wang Chang.

As some point between 262 and 264, (Note: There are multiple differing accounts on Ji Kang's death date; scholarly consensus is that he died between 262 and 264.) Shan Tao's friend Ji Kang was to be executed under orders from Sima Zhao, who was then regent after Shi's death in March 255. Before the execution, Ji Kang said to his son Ji Shao, "With Juyuan around, you will not be an orphan."

Shan Tao became friends with He You (和逌; son of He Qia) late in his life; he was also good friends with both Zhong Hui and Pei Xiu. Even as Zhong and Pei engaged in court politics, both men remained friends with Shan, even as they knew Shan was friendly with the other party.

In early 264, as news of Zhong Hui's Rebellion reached Sima Zhao, the latter prepared to lead troops to suppress the revolt. At the time, most members of the imperial Cao clan were residing in Ye. Sima Zhao said to Shan, "I will settle matters in the west; I thus delegate matters at the home front to you." Shan was sent with 500 troops from Sima Zhao's personal guard to garrison Ye. That year, Sima Zhao considered making his younger son Sima You heir instead of Sima Yan; Shan Tao advised against it.

One of Shan Tao's final duties under Cao Wei was to escort Cao Huan (by then reappointed Prince of Chenliu) to Ye in February 266.

== Life under Jin Dynasty ==
In the early part of the Taishi era (265-274), Shan Tao was made Count of Xinta.

In 274, Shan Tao advised Emperor Wu to exempt Ji Shao from his father's crime and appoint him as an Assistant in the Palace Library. The emperor agreed, but took one step further by giving him the higher rank of Assistant Director. Ji Shao wanted to turn down the appointment, but after a personal visit from Shan Tao, he finally agreed.

On 28 January 283, Shan Tao was appointed situ. He died less than two months later, and was given the posthumous name Kang (康).
