= Liu Ling (poet) =

Chinese scholar and poet (221–300)

- Born: Liu Ling; 221
- Died: 300
- Occupations: Poet, Scholar

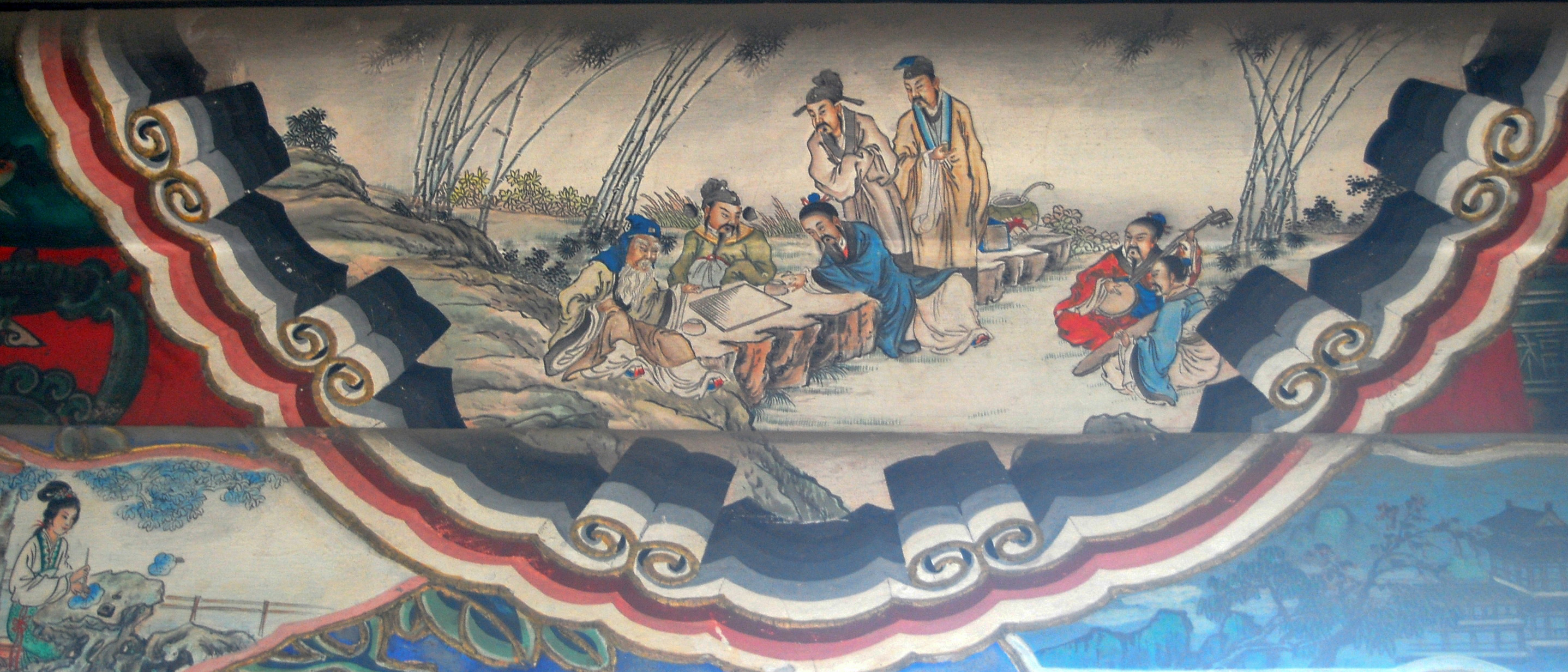
The Seven Sages of the Bamboo Grove depicted in the Long Corridor, one of whom is Liu Ling

Liu Ling (Chinese: 劉伶), born 221 and died 300 CE, was a Chinese poet and scholar. Little information survives about his family background, though he is described in historical sources as short and unattractive, with a dissipated appearance.

== Name ==
Liu Ling's name is commonly misprinted as "劉靈".

== Background ==
Liu Ling was born in the state of Pei of the Western Jin dynasty (266–316 CE), which is now the Suzhou of Anhui province.

== Seven Sages of the Bamboo Grove ==
One of the Seven Sages of the Bamboo Grove, Liu Ling was a Taoist who retreated to the countryside in order to pursue a spontaneous and natural existence that would have been impossible under the tight constraints of the Imperial court.

== Personality and life ==
Popularly regarded as an eccentric, he was notorious for his love of alcohol. The earliest depictions of him, on tombs in Nanjing, show him drinking wine from a gourd, and his most famous work is a poem titled "In Praise of the Virtue of Wine".

An oft-quoted folk tale about Liu Ling claims that he was followed at all times by a servant bearing a bottle of wine and a shovel, who was equally prepared to offer him wine at a moment's notice or bury him if he fell over dead. Another cites his practice of commonly walking around his home in the nude, explaining to surprised visitors that he considered the entire universe his home and his rooms his clothing, and then inquiring as to why they had just entered his pants. "I see the earth and skies as my home, and this room as my pants. What are you, gentlemen, doing in my pants?"

Liu Ling and his beliefs about drinking are mentioned in Chapter XXXVI of Jack London's autobiographical novel John Barleycorn.

== Literature ==
- Ulrich Holbein: Unheilige Narren. 22 Lebensbilder. Marix Verlag, Wiesbaden 2012, ISBN 978-3-86539-300-5. S.42-43 (German)
