= Ruan Xian =

3rd-century Chinese scholar and musician

Ruan Xian 阮咸
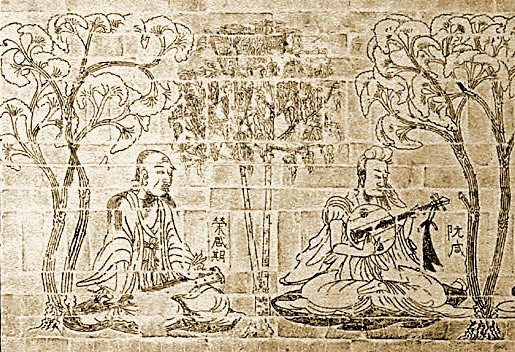
- Ruan Xian (right) and Rong Qiqi, in a relief dating from the 4th century
- Born: Unknown; Weishi County, Henan
- Died: Unknown
- Other name: Zhongrong (仲容)
- Children: Ruan Zhan; Ruan Fu
- Father: Ruan Xi
- Relatives: Ruan Yu (grandfather); Ruan Ji (uncle)

Ruan Xian
- Chinese: 阮咸
Transcriptions
Standard Mandarin
- Hanyu Pinyin: Ruǎn Xián
- Wade–Giles: Juan Hsien

Ruan Xian (fl. 3rd century), courtesy name Zhongrong, was a Chinese scholar who lived in the Six Dynasties period. One of the Seven Sages of the Bamboo Grove, he was a skilled player of the Chinese lute, an old version of pipa which has been called ruan after his name since the Tang dynasty. His achievement in music reached such high as to be described as "divine understanding" in the Book of Jin. Ruan Xian had a Xianbei slave who gave birth to his son, Ruan Fu.
