= Qingtan =

Chinese philosophical movement

Qingtan (Chinese: 清談; pinyin: Qīngtán; Wade–Giles: Ch'ing^{1}-t'an^{2}; lit. 'pure conversation') was a Chinese philosophical movement and social practice among political and intellectual elites which developed during the Wei-Jin (魏晉) period and continued on through the Southern and Northern dynasties. Originating among Daoist scholars, particularly those belonging to the syncretic Xuanxue school, qingtan involved "pure conversation" concerning metaphysics and philosophy in the form of informal gatherings for discourse and debate. These gatherings originated as politically impartial continuations of the more explicitly politically "pure criticism" (清議) protests of the later Han dynasty. As their popularity increased, these conversations were enriched by the participation of Buddhist and Confucian scholars. Consequently, their scope broadened to include a greater variety of perspectives and topics, including the discussion of Confucian ethics and Buddhist sutras.

== See also ==
- Xuanxue
- Seven Sages of the Bamboo Grove
