= Ji Kang =

Chinese writer, poet, philosopher, musician and alchemist (223–262)

- 嵇康

Attendant Counsellor (中散大夫)
- In office ?–?
- Monarch: Cao Mao / Cao Huan

Personal details
- Born: between 223 and 225 Suixi County, Anhui
- Died: between 262 and 264 (aged 39) Luoyang, Henan
- Spouse: Cao Lin's daughter
- Relations: Ji Xi (brother)
- Children: Ji Shao
- Parent: Ji Zhao (father)
- Occupation: Composer, essayist, philosopher, poet
- Courtesy name: Shuye (叔夜)

Ji Kang
- Chinese: 嵇康
Transcriptions
Standard Mandarin
- Hanyu Pinyin: Xī Kāng, Jī Kāng
- Wade–Giles: Hsi^{1} K'ang^{1}, Chi^{1} K'ang^{1}
Yue: Cantonese
- Yale Romanization: Hāi Hōng, Kāi Hōng
- Jyutping: Hai^{1} Hong^{1}, Kai^{1} Hong^{1}
Southern Min
- Hokkien POJ: Ê Khng, Hê Khng

Ji Kang (Chinese: 嵇康, c.224–c.263), (Note: There are multiple differing accounts on Ji Kang's death date; scholarly consensus is that he died between 262 and 264. Ji's biography in Book of Jin recorded that he was 40 (by East Asian reckoning) when he died.) sometimes referred to as Xi Kang, courtesy name Shuye (叔夜 (Note: "shu" means the 3rd son of the main wife; "ye" means night)), was a Chinese composer, essayist, philosopher, and poet of the Three Kingdoms period. He was one of the Seven Sages of the Bamboo Grove who held aloof from the dangerous politics of third-century China to devote themselves to art and refinement.

Ji Kang is noted as an author and was also a famous composer and guqin-player. He was described as a handsome and tall man (approximately 1.88 metres). Ji Kang had a boyfriend, Ruan Ji, who was also part of the Seven Sages of the Bamboo Grove. Both Ji and Ruan were skilled whistlers, developing a talent in transcendental whistling.

== Life ==
As a thinker, Ji Kang wrote on longevity, music theory, politics and ethics. Among his works were Yangsheng Lun (飬生論, Essay on Nourishing Life), Shengwu Aile Lun (聲無哀樂論, Discourse on sounds [as] lacking sorrow or joy, i.e. On the Absence of Sentiments in Music), Qin Fu (琴賦, A Composition on the Qin), and Shisi Lun (釋私論, Discourse on Individuality). As a musician, Ji Kang composed a number of solo pieces for the qin, including a well-known composition titled Guangling San which recounts the assassination of a king of Han. It was said to be inspired by a spirit visitation, and was widely acclaimed. (Note: Northen Song scholar He Yuan's (何薳) Chun Zhu Ji Wen (《春渚纪闻》) recorded that Ji Kang learnt the Guangling san from Du Kui's son Du Meng.)

Ji Kang was highly critical of Confucianism and challenged many social conventions of his time, provoking scandal and suspicion. He married Cao Cao's granddaughter (or great-granddaughter according to some). Ji Kang assumed a post under the Cao Wei state, but official work bored him. When the regent Sima Zhao came to power, he offered Ji Kang a civil position, but Ji Kang insolently rejected Sima Zhao's envoy Zhong Hui. (Note: In the chapter "Simple and Proud" (简傲) of Shishuo Xinyu (世说新语), records a dramatic episode: General Zhong Hui, arriving with a retinue, found Ji Kang hammering at the forge. Ji Kang was keeping working as if no one else was present. A prolonged silence hung in the air before Zhong Hui prepared to depart. Only then did Ji Kang ask, "What brings you? What sends you away? (何所聞而來 何所見而去)" "What I heard, What I see. (聞所聞而來 見所見而去)" answered Zhong Hui.)

When one of Ji Kang's friends was imprisoned on false charges, Ji Kang testified in his defense, but both were sent to jail. At Zhong Hui's urging, Sima Zhao sentenced Ji Kang to death. Three thousand scholars petitioned for his pardon, but his enemies were implacable. Before his execution, Ji Kang is said to have played one last melody on the guqin, a swan song forever lost.

He was also believed to have become a xian (Taoist immortal) through shijie by mainstream Taoism.

== See also ==
- List of Chinese authors
