= Dianmu =

Chinese goddess of lightning

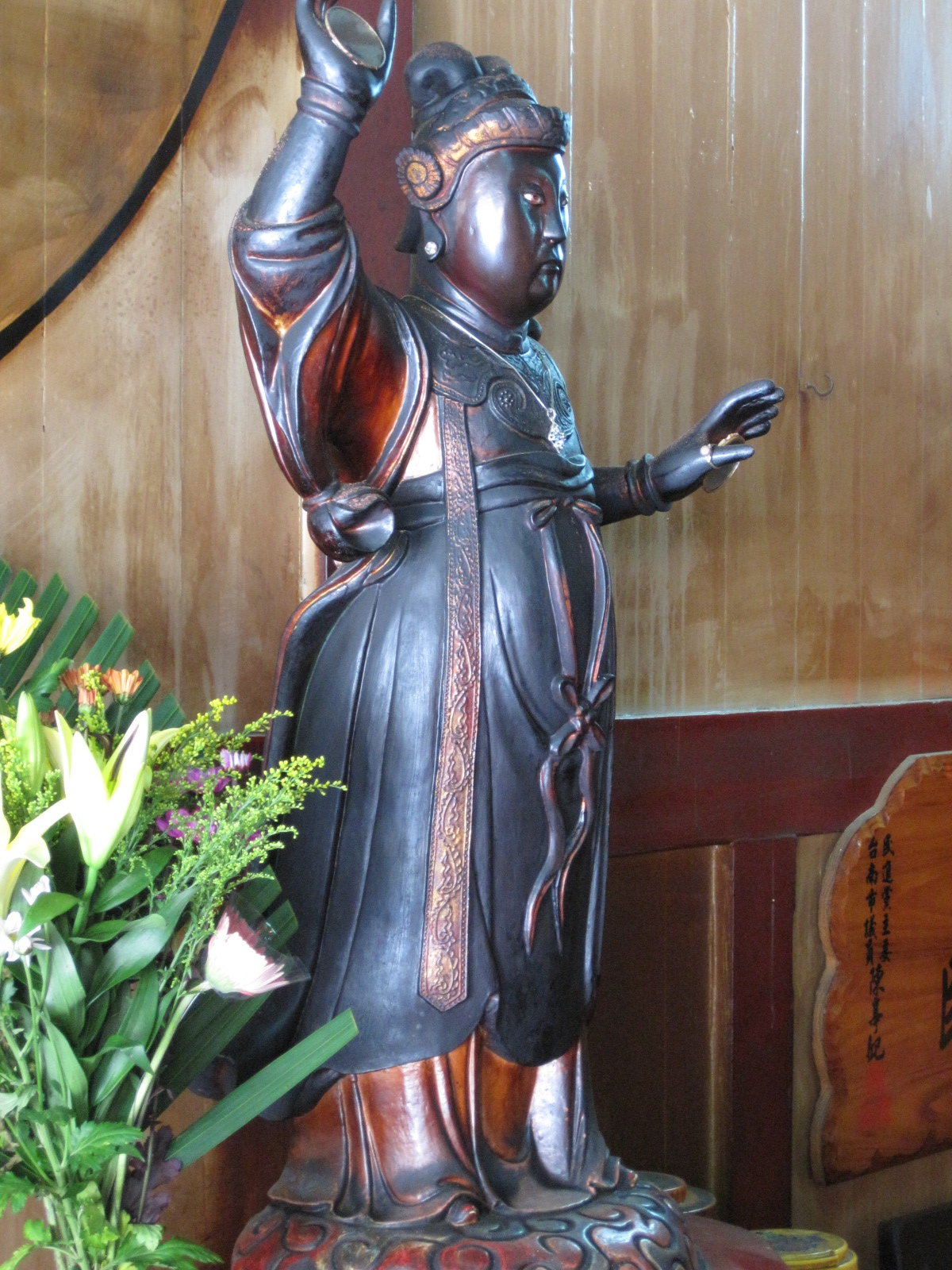
- A statue of Dianmu
- Simplified Chinese: 電母
- Literal meaning: Mother of Lightning
Transcriptions
Standard Mandarin
- Hanyu Pinyin: Diànmǔ

Dianmu (Chinese: 電母; pinyin: Diànmǔ; lit. 'Mother of Lightning'), also known as Leizi, is the Chinese goddess of lightning, who is said to have used flashing mirrors to send bolts of lightning across the sky.

She is married to Leigong, the god of thunder. She is one of the gods who work together to produce the phenomena of thunder. Other companions are Yun Tong (云童; Yún Tóng; 'Cloud Youth/Kid'), who whips up clouds, and Yu Shi ("Rain Master") who causes downpours by dipping his sword into a pot. Roaring winds rush forth from a type of goatskin bag manipulated by Fengbo ("Earl of Wind/Wind Uncle"), who was later transformed into Feng Po Po ("Old Lady Wind").

== Legend ==
Dianmu was once a human, who lived with her mother. One day, she was dumping rice husks, because they were too hard for her mother to eat. When the short-tempered thunder god Leigong saw her dumping the husks out, he thought she was wasting food, so he killed her. When the Jade Emperor found out, he was infuriated at Leigong's careless murder. The Jade Emperor revived Dianmu, making her a goddess. Dianmu was made to marry Leigong, who took on the responsibility of caring for her. Dianmu's job is now to work with Lei Gong. She uses mirrors to shine light on the Earth, so Leigong can see who he hits and makes sure they aren't innocent. This is why lightning comes before thunder.

=== In other depictions ===
Dianmu also appears in Wu Cheng'en's late 16th-century novel, the Journey to the West; she appears during the events of the Slow Cart Kingdom (車遲國; Chechi), where three 'Animal Strength/Power Immortals', "Tiger Strength", "Deer/Elk Strength" and "Goat/Antelope Strength", three demons who disguised themselves as Taoist magicians to deceive the King of the Kingdom of Chechi, by means of having ended a seemingly-endless drought through the means of a legitimate magic tablet that can control the weather by summoning gods in control of various aspects of the weather, including Dianmu, accompanied by 云童 ('Cloud Youth'). Once Sun Wukong interrupts the summons, Dianmu and her fellow weather deities help the Buddhists instead of the demons in their rain-making competition.

== Storms ==
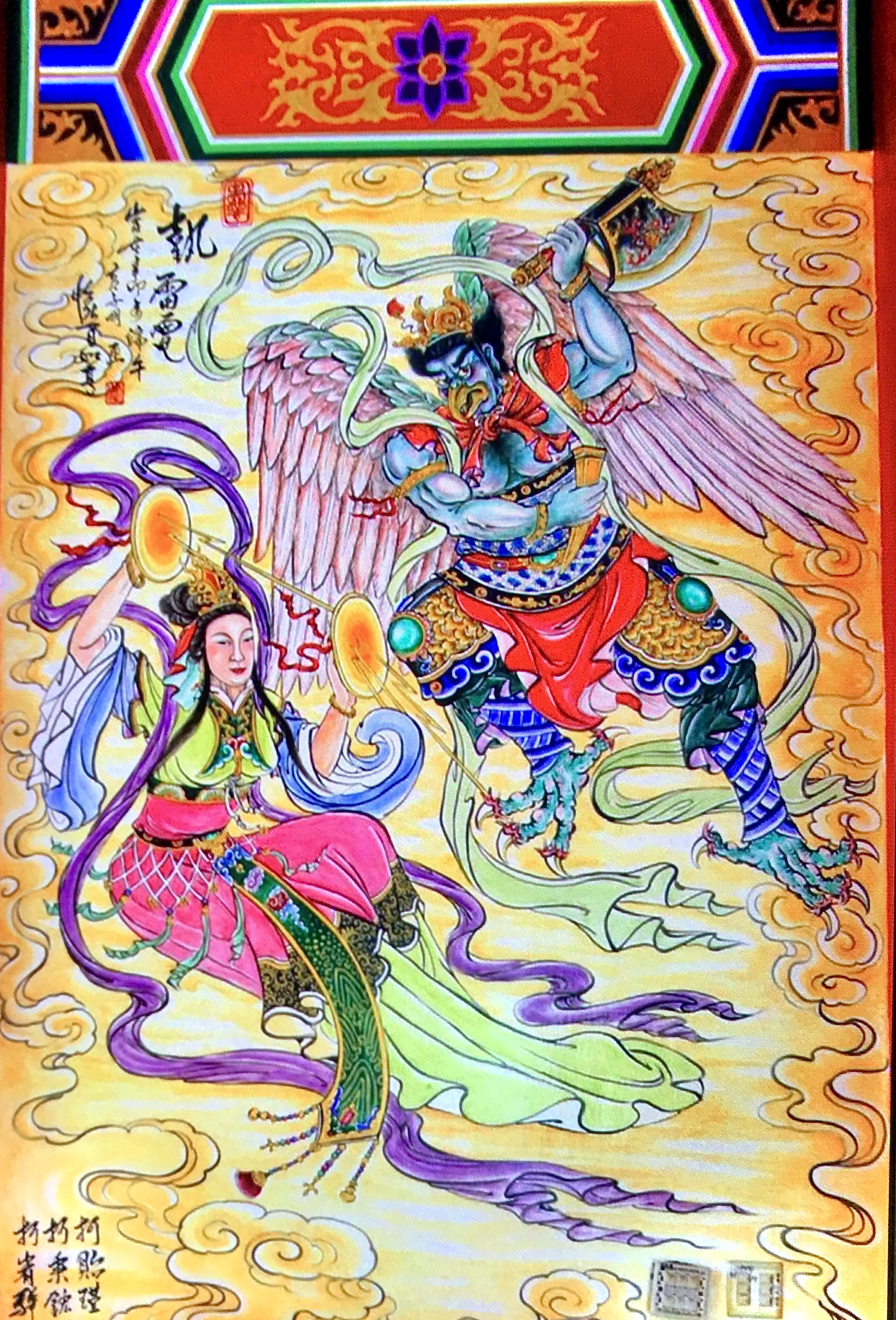
Dianmu and Leigong

The following have been named after her:

- Typhoon Dianmu (T0406, 09W, Helen) – struck Japan.
- Severe Tropical Storm Dianmu (2010) (T1004, 05W, Ester)
- Tropical Storm Dianmu (2016) (T1608, 11W) – struck Indochina
- Tropical Storm Dianmu (2021) (T2115, 21W)
