= Feng Po Po =

Goddess of the wind in Chinese mythology

Feng Po Po (traditional Chinese: 風婆婆; simplified Chinese: 风婆婆; pinyin: Fēng Pópo; Wade–Giles: Fêng^{1} P'o^{2}-p'o), also called Feng Popo or Feng Pho Pho, is the goddess of the wind in Chinese mythology who rules over storms and moisture. She is referred to as "Madame Wind", and is usually depicted as a crone, old and wrinkled. Feng Po Po can be seen riding through clouds on the back of a tiger which represents courage and bravery signifying her importance in the Chinese mythology. The tiger the goddess rides on is also a symbol of the autumnal season and therefore associated with the Crone stage of life which further ties the tiger to the goddess.

Feng Po Po is usually portrayed as replacing Feng Bo, the male form of Fei Lian. It is unclear whether she replaces Fei Lian, or becomes his new human form. In some later traditions, myths such as Leizi's marriage to the Thunder God, Feng Po Po directly replaces Feng Bo and is the one who was moving everyone.

== Powers ==
Feng Po Po carries a full sack of wind in her arms when she is riding on the back of a tiger. On calm days she expresses her generous spirit by stuffing all the winds into her sack, but when her mood turns foul or the sack of wind becomes too heavy, she unleashes pent up winds in the form of violent storms.

== Popular culture ==
- In Marvel Comics, a superhero named after the Chinese goddess of wind Feng Po Po.

== See also ==
- Yu Shi
