= Yu Shiqie =

Goddess of rain in taoism and Chinese folk religion

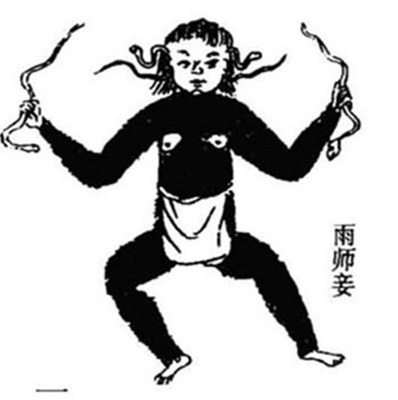
Yu Shiqie

Yu Shiqie (Chinese: 雨师妾; lit. 'Rain Master Consort') is a Chinese spirit or goddess of rain. She appears in the Classic of Mountains and Seas as the leader of a country called Yushi (雨师国); her "name" is a title indicating that she is the consort of Yu Shi.

== Legend ==
According to the Classic of Mountains and Seas, it is recorded: "The Consort of the Rain Master resides in the north. She has a dark complexion and holds a snake in each hand. She has a green snake in her left ear and a red snake in her right ear, and holds a turtle in each hand".

According to the legend, she was originally the ruler of the Yushi Kingdom in the East Sea. Because of her ability to control dragons, she was also known as the "Dragon Maiden".

However, the legends surrounding the Consort of the Rain Master go beyond her being recognized as the most beautiful woman of ancient times. Some believe that the Consort of the Rain Master does not refer to an individual alone. It is believed that Yu Shique represents a nation or a group of people. Haoyi's commentary in Shanhai jing states, "Yu Shique is also the name of a country, Yushi. The ruler of the Yushi Kingdom possessed great skill in controlling dragons".
