= Feilian =

Chinese wind spirit and mythical beast

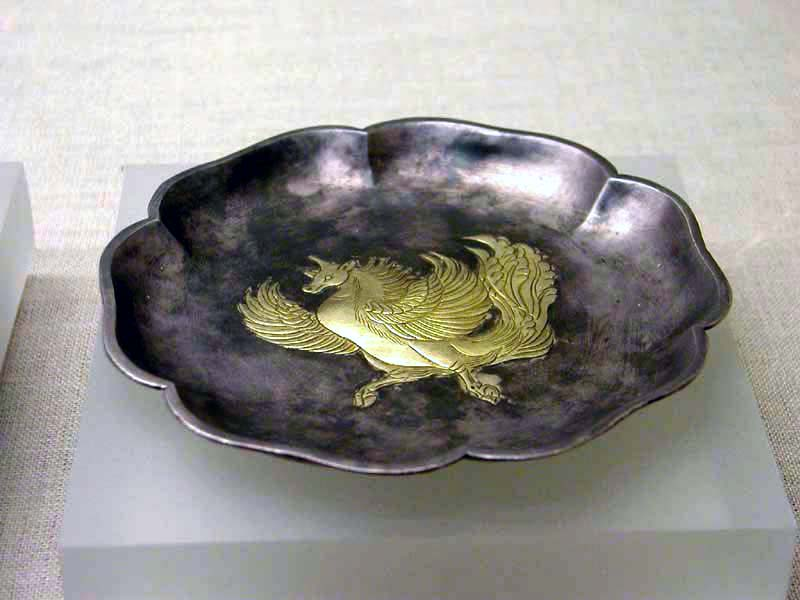
Gilt hexagonal silver plate with a feilian beast pattern

Feilian (traditional Chinese: 飛廉; simplified Chinese: 飞廉; pinyin: fēilián) or (蜚廉) is a Chinese wind spirit from a southern tradition, later identified with and subsumed under the primary wind deity Fengbo. Feilian has also been identified with a late Shang dynasty minister as well as with the mythical phoenix bird, and retained a separate identity as a mythical creature after losing its status as master of the wind.

== Concept ==
=== Southern origin ===
Feilian is first attested in the influential poem Li sao by Qu Yuan, wherein Feilian assists the poet in part of his mystical journey. This work comes from Chu, a Zhou dynasty state which was on the periphery of the Zhou cultural sphere, and is typically dated to the 300s or 200s bce. Wang Yi, who collated and annotated the transmitted Chu ci collection centuries later, annotates this mention of Feilian with the text "Feilian is Fengbo", which demonstrates that the various wind spirits were already being systematised under a single identity. Wang Yi goes on to explain that in order to ride a dragon through the clouds as the Li sao narrator does, one must borrow the strength of "jifeng" (疾風; jífēng; 'an ill wind'). This term jifeng acts as a gloss for Feilian in the Shiji. According to Deng Xiaohua (鄧曉花), fēilián (Old Chinese: ZS *pɯl-ɡ·rem; B&S *Cə.pə[r]*(k-)[r]em), might be a dialectal variant of 風 (OC: ZS *plum; B&S *prəm) "wind". This same relationship was explored by Tôdô in 1959. Sun Zuoyun's (孫作雲) influential 1943 study of Feilian argues that the term feilian was an alternative written representation of the sound in Old Chinese that was the pronunciation of 風; 风; fēng; 'wind'. Feilian appears twice more in the Chu ci collection: once in Jiu bian and once in Yuan you, each time as a helpful spirit assisting the narrator.

=== Evolution ===
Early Chinese wind spirits were many. The Shang had the masters of the four directions, an eastern tradition had the naturalistic "Great Wind" (大風), another tradition considered the winnowing basket constellation (箕星, comprising four stars in Sagittarius) as the controller of the winds, the south had Feilian, and theorists have speculated that a number of named mythical birds from early Chinese culture – including the phoenix and the great peng bird (鵬) of the Zhuangzi – should be considered originally to have been wind spirits. The Zhou culture had two competing wind spirits: Fengshi and Fengbo, the latter of whom would end up subsuming all these traditions, and lives on in the Taoist pantheon as Fang Daozhang (方道彰).

In Feilian's identity as Fengbo, he carries wind with him in a bag and stirs up trouble. Feilian is kept in check by Houyi, the heavenly archer and Shang legendary culture hero. Feilian has become attached to the later mythology of the Yellow Emperor, against whom he contended under the leadership of Chiyou.

Before consolidation into the Fengbo entity, Feilian was also thought to be able to grant immortality. Emperor Wu of Han (r. 141–87 bce) believed this sufficiently to order the construction of several buildings dedicated to Feilian worship in pursuit of this gift of eternal life. In the Huainanzi, Feilian is mentioned as a creature one can ride astride into the world of spirits where nothing perishes.

=== As an individual ===
In histories of the consolidation of the Zhou conquest of Shang, the Duke of Zhou pursued Shang king Di Xin's minister Feilian to the seacoast and killed him there. This episode is narrated in the Mengzi as well as the excavated text Xinian, part of the Qinghua University bamboo slips collection, a product of Chu provisionally dated around 370 bce. According to the Shiji, which carries a not dissimilar account, Feilian's descendants would later found the state of Qin. Various theories have attempted to explain how the name Feilian was attached both to an individual minister at the end of the Shang dynasty and a Chu cultural wind spirit.

== Form ==
Modern English language sources state Feilian is a winged dragon with the head of a deer and the tail of a snake. Hawkes states Feilian is commonly depicted as a winged deer, but it can encompass a multiplicity of different winged creatures.

Commentary to the Shiji provide earlier textual depictions. Where Emperor Wu of Han ordered the construction of buildings dedicated to Feilian worship, Eastern Han commentator Ying Shao defined Feilian as a sacred beast, able to control the winds. Jin dynasty commentator Jin Zhuo provided a more detailed description, saying Feilian had a deer's body with a bird's head, horns, and a snake's tail, with markings like a leopard's spots. Similarly, in the Huainanzi, where Feilian is ridden like a horse in the world outside the world, Eastern Han commentator Gao You states that Feilian is the name of a winged beast with long fur. Western Han rhapsodist Sima Xiangru's Shang lin fu (上林賦) mentions Feilian next to another mythical creature, the xiezhi (獬豸). In annotation, Eastern Jin dynasty commentator Guo Pu equates Feilian with the "dragon sparrow" (龍雀), saying it has the head of a deer and the body of a bird, in a neat inversion of Jin Zhuo's roughly contemporaneous description.

=== As other mythical creatures ===
Sun Zuoyun expanded upon his reconstruction of feilian as an alternative written representation of the word 風; 风; fēng; 'wind', using the fact that it was often used to write the word 鳳; 凤; fèng; 'phoenix' since the graphical forms had not yet differentiated, to identify Feilian with the mythical phoenix. He went on to claim that several Han dynasty stone mortuary figures from Luoyang and Ya'an, all with wings, horns, claws, and feathers, should be understood as representing the Feilian. During the Shang dynasty, the word for "phoenix" was sometimes written using the words for "deer" and "long-tailed bird" squished together into a single glyph; a direct reflection of the Feilian's chimeric appearance.

Lin Tongyan argues that given the first character of the term feilian (飛; 飞; fēi) means "flying", and the second character (廉; lián) is pronounced similarly to 麟; lín, Feilian should be conceptualised as a type of qilin capable of winged flight.

== In popular culture ==
- Feilian is one of the Chinese mythical creatures depicted in Wo Long Fallen Dynasty as a Divine Beast. Feilian is contracted to Dian Wei and later Xu Chu and the protagonist. Dian Wei after becoming consumed by Yin qi, merged with Feilian, becoming a humanoid Feilian Yaoguai.
