= Sun Deng (recluse) =

Taoist recluse and transcendental whistler

Chinese name
- Traditional Chinese: 孫登
- Simplified Chinese: 孙登
Transcriptions
Standard Mandarin
- Hanyu Pinyin: Sūn Dēng
- Wade–Giles: Sun Teng
Yue: Cantonese
- Jyutping: Syun^{1} Dang^{1}
Middle Chinese
- Middle Chinese: Swon Tong
Old Chinese
- Baxter–Sagart (2014): Sˤun Tˤəŋ

Korean name
- Hangul: 손등
- Hanja: 孫登
Transcriptions
- Revised Romanization: Son Deung
- McCune–Reischauer: Son Tŭng

Japanese name
- Kanji: 孫登
- Hiragana: そんとう
Transcriptions
- Revised Hepburn: Son Tō

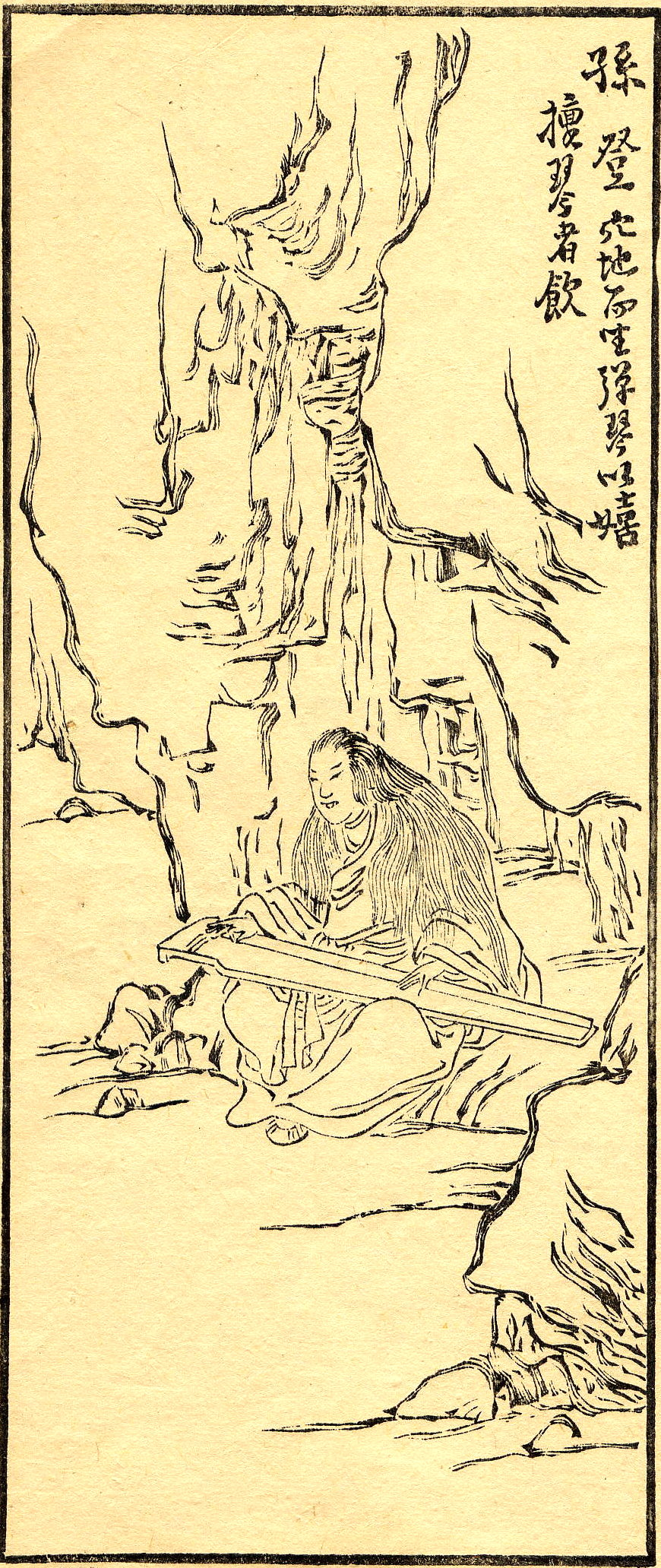
Long-haired Sun Deng playing the one-stringed zither in his mountain cave

Sun Deng (孫登; fl.230–260 CE) was a Daoist sage-recluse, a zitherist, and allegedly the last master of transcendental whistling. Chinese literature has various anecdotes about Sun Deng refusing to teach the musicians Ji Kang (223–262) and Ruan Ji (210–263), two of the iconoclastic Seven Sages of the Bamboo Grove.

The moral of the story about Ruan Ji visiting Sun Deng, who preferred supernatural whistling over traditional master-disciple dialog, is the ineffability of the Dao (as explained in the opening of the Daodejing). The Chinese poetry of the Six Dynasties and Tang dynasty developed this narrative into the "absent recluse" genre, expressing the unfulfilled desire to obtain wisdom by entering into conversation with a sage-recluse dwelling in the mountains.

== Ji Kang stories ==
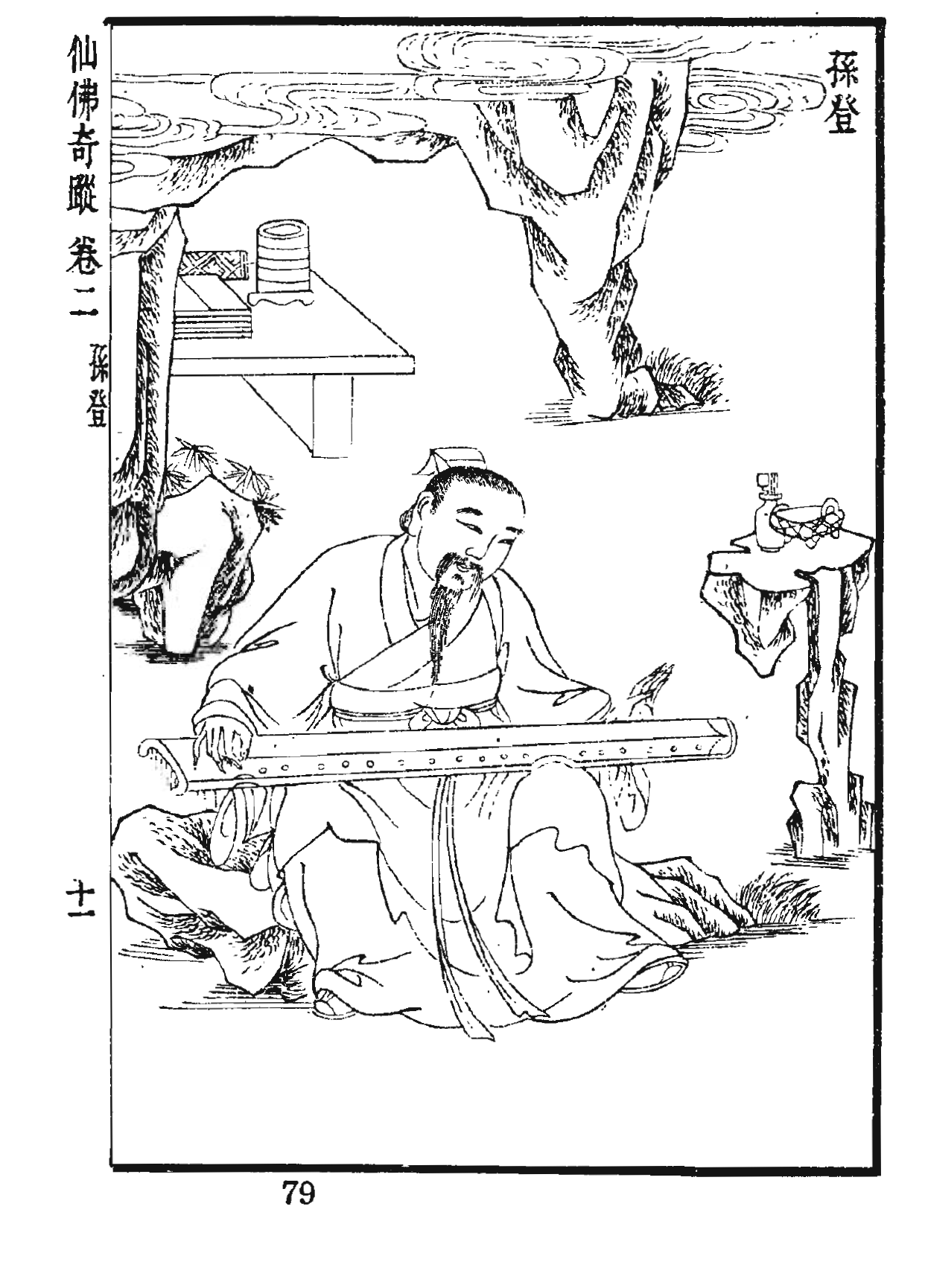
Sun Deng playing the qin zither

Ji Kang or Xi Kang (223–262) was a prominent intellectual of the Cao Wei (220–265) period, Daoist philosopher, author, poet, and musician. He was leader of the Seven Worthies/Sages of the Bamboo Grove, a group of intellectuals and artists who met occasionally at his estate to drink wines, take drugs, play music, and engage in witty qingtan "pure conversation".

Ji Kang's polymathic interests ranged from xian "transcendence; immortality" techniques to music theory. His essay Yangsheng lun "On Nourishing Life" contends that one can achieve longevity through Daoist breathing exercises, diets (e.g., bigu), and drugs (Cold-Food Powder). Drug use was widespread among the literati in early medieval China, and Ji Kang was "reputed to have been a connoisseur in this field". Ji's writings on music include the famous Qin fu "A Rhapsody on the Qin" zither, Shengwu aile lun "Essay on the Absence of Sorrow or Joy in Music", and a number of solo pieces for qin.

The classical Chinese stringed instrument qin (琴; "zither; [sometimes translated] lute") is called guqin (古琴; "old zither") in Modern Standard Chinese, owing to the common use of qin in names for instrumental loanwords (such as 口琴; kouqin; "mouth organ; harmonica"). Sun Deng was renowned for playing a one-string version of the qin (一弦琴); the 499 Zhen'gao 真誥 says Sun Deng could "derive eight notes by plucking a single string."

Ji/Xi Kang and Ruan Ji were close friends, famous for their skills in poetry, music, and qingtan ripostes. They helped to develop xuanxue "Neo-Daoism" and emphasized the importance of ziran "naturalness; spontaneity". Ji and Ruan were in a homosexual relationship with Shan Tao, another one of the Seven Worthies, who described their friendship as "stronger than metal and fragrant as orchids". Ji Kang and Ruan Ji were such close friends that Jiruan (嵇阮) was a popular portmanteau for the pair. Ji and Ruan both tried unsuccessfully to study zither and transcendental whistling with Sun Deng.

=== Shenxian zhuan ===
Ge Hong's (4th century) Daoist Shenxian zhuan "Biographies of Divine Transcendents" hagiography of Sun Deng 孙登 has the earliest version of the story about his refusal to teach Ji Kang about zither playing.

Sun Deng's origin is not known. He stayed in the mountains, sitting in caves, strumming the zither and studying the Changes. Winter or summer he wore only a single-layer garment, but when the weather grew extremely cold, someone observed him loosen his hair and use it to cover his body. It was over ten feet in length. When the Grand Mentor Yang Jun 楊駿 sent a messenger to invite Sun Deng to converse with him, Sun made no reply. Yang Jun then sent him a lined cloth robe as a gift. Upon its delivery, Sun came out from his gate, borrowed someone's knife, and cut the robe in two; he then placed the upper and lower halves in separate places outside Yang's gate. He also made a loud sound as if he were being cut in two. At the time, people thought him mad. Only later did they realize that Yang would be executed that way and that Sun was doing this as a symbolic prediction. Yang had him arrested and would not release him, so Sun died. Yang furnished a coffin and had him buried near Zhen Bridge. Several days later someone spotted him at Dongma Hill, so this person sent a letter to a friend of his in Luoxia. Ji Shuye [i.e., Ji Kang], who had ambitions to outstrip his era, once visited Sun Deng. Sun would not speak with him. When Ji raised objections, Sun calmly strummed his zither, until, after a long time, Ji finally stepped back. Sun then said, "Young man, you have excellent talent, but you lack knowledge of how to preserve the body. How will you avoid [harm]?" (It was not long after this that Ji was destroyed by implication in a grave affair.) Now Ji was skilled at playing the zither. At this point, Sun, using only one string, played a whole tune, and Ji, hearing it, sighed and became lost in thought.

Yang Jun (d. 291) was a Jin Dynasty (266–420) official during the reign of Emperor Wu and regent for Emperor Hui. Sun Deng's "death" and reappearance is typical for Daoist shijie (尸解; "release from corpse") fake burial, the lowest level of xian "transcendence". This "grave affair" refers to Ji Kang getting involved in Cao Wei court politics, and sentenced to death by regent Sima Zhao for testifying to help a friend.

=== Shishuo xinyu ===
The Shishuo Xinyu "A New Account of Tales of the World" says, "While Hsi K'ang was wandering among the mountains of Chi Commandery (Honan), he met the Taoist adept [道士], Sun Teng, and thereafter continued his wanderings in his company. As K'ang was on the eve of departing, Teng said, 'As far as your ability is concerned, it's high enough, but your way of preserving your own life is inadequate'."

The Shishuo xinyu commentary by the Liang dynasty scholar Liu Xiaobiao 劉孝標 or Liu Jun 劉峻 (462–521) quotes four texts. First, the anonymous Xi Kang Jishu (嵇康集序) says, "In the summer Sun Teng wove garments out of grass, and in the winter he covered himself with his unbound hair. He was fond of reading the "Book of Changes" and playing a one-stringed zither. All who saw him were attracted and delighted by him." Second, the Wei Shi Chunqiu (魏氏春秋; "Chronicles of the Clans of Wei"), by Sun Sheng (ca. 302–373), says, "Sun Teng was by nature free of both joy and anger. If anyone doused him under water and then brought him out to look at him, Teng would just laugh aloud. Whatever items of clothing or food were provided him by households where he stayed he would never decline, but when he left he would leave them behind." Third, the (4th century) Wenshi zhuan (文士傳; "Biographies of Scholars"), by Zhang Yin 張隱, gives this version of the story.

During the Chia-p'ing era (249–253) some people of Chi Prefecture had gone into the mountains, where they saw a man. The place where he lived was an overhanging cliff rising a hundred jen (about 700 feet), where dense woods grew in shady luxuriance, yet his spirit and intelligence were extremely bright. He said of himself that his surname was Sun and his name, Teng, with the courtesy name, Kung-ho. When he heard of him, Hsi K'ang followed him about for three years. K'ang asked for his prognosis concerning his own future, but Teng never answered. However, K'ang always sighed in respectful admiration over the fine subtlety contained in his godlike counsels. When K'ang was about to take his leave, he said to the man, "Sir, have you nothing, after all, to say?" Teng finally answered, "Do you know anything about fire? When it is lit it gives light. Yet knowing when not to use the light is, after all, included in knowing when to use it. When a man is born he is endowed with ability. Yet knowing when not to use his ability is, after all, included in knowing when to use it. Thus, knowing when to use light is included in getting enough fuel to keep it burning, and knowing when to use ability is included in understanding things well enough to complete one's allotted years. Now your ability is abundant, but your understanding slight. You'll have difficulty avoiding trouble in today's world. Don't ask me anything more." K'ang was unable to use his advice, and when he became involved in the Lü An affair and was cast into prison, he composed a poem reproaching himself, as follows: "In the past I used to blush before Liu-hsia Hui, But now I am ashamed before Sun Teng."

Liu-hsia Hui or Liuxia Hui is the loyal politician Zhan Huo (720–621 BCE). Fourth, Wang Yin's 王隱 (4th century) Jinshu explains, "Sun Teng was the one interviewed by Juan Chi. Hsi K'ang treated him as his teacher, with all the ceremony expected of a disciple. During the transition between Wei and Chin (ca. 260–265) it was easy to fall prey to jealousy and suspicion; both noble and base were engulfed together. For this reason Sun Teng was silent on some points."

=== Zengxiang liexian zhuan ===
The Yuan dynasty (c. 14th century) Zengxiang liexian zhuan (增像列仙傳; "Enlarged and Illustrated Collected Biographies of Transcendents") elaborates on Ji/Xi Kang meeting Sun Deng, and mentions transcendental whistling in addition to zither playing.

Sun Teng dwelt in a cave on the North Mountain in the prefecture of Chi [in Honan]. In summer, he made himself garments of plaited straw; in winter he covered himself only with his long hair. He was an expert in the art of whistling without a break, and he loved to read the Canon of Changes and to thrum a one-stringed lute. By temperament he was prone neither to joy nor to anger. Once, we are told, in the hope of seeing him angry, a man pitched him into the river, but when Sun Teng had scrambled out, he only burst into fits of laughter. The high-born statesman Hsi K'ang accompanied him in his wanderings for three years, yet whenever he questioned his Master about his aims, he could get no reply. When about to leave him, Hsi K'ang said: "After all this time, Sir, have you no word for me?" Sun Teng replied: "You know what fire is, don't you? It has the natural property of giving light, but not of using that light; yet its importance depends on the use made of its light. In man, intellectual capacity is a natural gift, but not the use made of that capacity; yet his worth depends on the use he makes of it. The use of light is contingent on a supply of fuel wherewith to preserve its radiance; and the use of intellect consists in acquiring a knowledge of Pure Truth so as to keep one's life immune from harm." Hsi K'ang also asked for instruction in playing the lute, but Sun Teng would not teach him. "Your intellectual capacity is great," he said, "but your knowledge is small. It will be difficult for you to pass unscathed through the world of to-day." … In the end, Sun Teng rose up to heaven in broad daylight.

== Ruan Ji stories ==
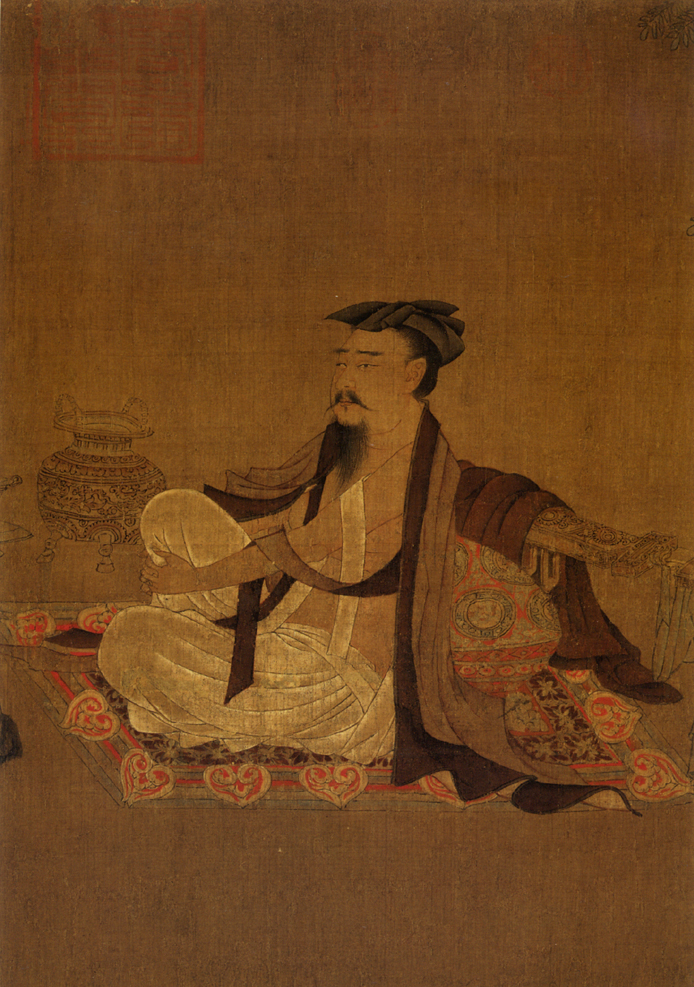
Ruan Ji, (c. 9th century) Tang dynasty portrait

Ruan Ji (210–263) was a skillful poet, essayist, and musician, who rebelled against orthodox Confucian rituals and conventions. He loved drinking wine, and his Jinshu biography says he avoided an arranged marriage into the Sima family by staying drunk for 60 days. The famous guqin-zither melody, Jiukuang "Drunken Ecstasy" is attributed to him.

Ruan wrote philosophical essays about the Yijing, Daodejing, and Zhuangzi, his masterful Yonghuai shi "Songs of My Soul", and Yue lun "Disquisition on Music". Among recluse poets who practiced transcendental whistling as a way to absorb themselves into nature, Ruan Ji was the most famous whistler of the Jin dynasty. After meeting Sun Deng, Ruan Ji immortalized him in Daren xiansheng zhuan "Biography of Master Great Man", which praises Daoist transcendence over the mundane world.

=== Shishuo xinyu ===
In the (5th century) Shishuo xinyu version of this transcendental whistling story about Ruan Ji, Sun Deng is referred to as the zhenren "perfected person" in the Sumen Mountains 蘇門山.

When Juan Chi whistled [嘯], he could be heard several hundred paces away. In the Su-men Mountains (Honan) there appeared from nowhere a Realized Man [真人] about whom the woodcutters were all relaying tales. Juan Chi went to see for himself and spied the man squatting with clasped knees by the edge of a cliff. Chi climbed the ridge to approach him and then squatted opposite him. Chi rehearsed for him briefly matters from antiquity to the present, beginning with an exposition of the Way of Mystical Quiescence [玄寂] of the Yellow Emperor and Shen Nung, and ending with an investigation of the excellence of the Supreme Virtue [盛德] of the Three Ages (Hsia, Shang, and Chou). But when Chi asked his opinion about it he remained aloof and made no reply. Chi then went on to expound that which lies beyond Activism [有為之教], and the techniques of Resting the Spirit [棲神] and Conducting the Vital Force [導氣]. But when Chi looked toward him for a reply, he was still exactly as before, fixedly staring without turning. Chi therefore turned toward him and made a long whistling sound [長嘯]. After a long while the man finally laughed and said, "Do it again." Chi whistled a second time [復嘯], but as his interest was now exhausted, he withdrew. He had returned about half-way down the ridge when he heard above him a shrillness like an orchestra of many instruments, while forests and valleys reechoed with the sound. Turning back to look, he discovered it was the whistling of the man he had just visited [向人嘯]. (49)

Donald Holzman comments on their meeting: "It (xiao) was an unintellectual art, probably a fairly strange kind of sound that is divorced from speech and reason....When Ruan Ji whistles Sun Teng sees that he is not merely a pedant, but also an adept of an art that imitates nature, that he is able to control his breath so as to make it resemble that very breath of heaven."

The Shishuo xinyu commentary by Liu Xiaobiao quotes two texts. First, the (4th century) Wei Shi Chunqiu (魏氏春秋) version says,

Juan Chi often went riding alone wherever his fancy led him, not following the roads or byways, to the point where carriage tracks would go no farther, and always he would return weeping bitterly. Once while he was wandering in the Su-men Mountains there was a recluse living there whose name no one knew, and whose only possessions were a few hu-measures of bamboo fruit, a mortar and pestle, and nothing more. When Juan Chi heard of him he went to see him and began conversing on the Way of Non-action [無為] of high antiquity, and went on to discuss the moral principles [義] of the Five Emperors and Three August Ones. The Master of Su-men remained oblivious and never even looked his way. Chi then with a shrill sound made a long whistling whose echoes reverberated through the empty stillness. The Master of Su-men finally looked pleased and laughed. After Chi bad gone down the hill, the Master gathered his breath and whistled shrilly with a sound like that of the phoenix. Chi had all his life been a connoisseur of music, and he borrowed the theme of his discussion with the Master of Su-men to express what was in his heart in a song, the words of which are: "The sun sets west of Mt. Pu-chou; The moon comes up from Cinnabar Pool. Essence of Yang is darkened and unseen; While Yin rays take their turn to win. His brilliance lasts but for a moment; her dark will soon again be full. If wealth and honor stay but for a trice must poverty and low estate be evermore?"

Second, the Zhulin Qixian Lun (竹林七賢論), by Dai Kui 戴逵 (d. 396) explains, "After Juan Chi returned (from the Su-men Mountains) he proceeded to compose the "Discourse on Mr. Great Man" [大人先生論]. What was said in this discourse all represented the basic feelings in his breast and heart. The main point was that Mr. Great Man was none other than Juan himself."

=== Jin shu ===
The (648) Book of Jin (49) biography of Ruan Ji uses changxiao and xiao to describe his meeting with Sun Deng.

Once [Juan] Chi met Sun Teng on Su-men Mountain. [Juan Chi] touched on topics of ancient times, and on the arts of "posing the spirit" and "leading the breath." [Sun] Teng kept silent throughout. As a result, [Juan] Chi expelled a long whistle [籍因長嘯而退], and took his leave. When he had descended halfway down the mountain, he heard a sound like the cry of the phoenix resounding throughout the peaks and valleys. It was the whistling of [Sun] Teng [乃登之嘯也].

Varsano explains transcendental whistling as a direct representation of the ineffable Dao, "his superhuman whistle, a primordial sound that does not describe the secrets of the universe, but incarnates it."

The context goes on to say that after Sun Deng refused to talk with Ruan Ji, Xi Kang followed Sun Deng travelling for three years. Since Sima Zhao became generalissimo in 255, Holzman dates Ruan Ji's visit around 257, and Xi Kang's around 258 to 260. Based on the different mountain names, Chan says Ruan Ji visited Sun Deng twice, first around 226–230, and then around 255–263; and dates Xi Kang's travels at around 249–251.

=== Xiaozhi ===
The anonymous (c. 8th century) Xiaozhi (嘯旨; "Principles of Whistling") mentions Sun Deng and Ruan Ji—honorifically called Sun Gong 孫公 "Master Sung" and Ruan Sizong 阮嗣宗 (his courtesy name)—as the last transcendental whistlers, and describes whistling tunes attributed to them, "Sumen Mountains" retells the story of Ruan's visit to Sun, and "Loose Rhymes of Ruan" is an easy-whistling melody.

The Xiaozhi Preface gives a transmission history of xiao-whistling that goes from mythological sages to the historical whistlers of Sun Deng and Ruan Ji. Laozi transmitted the technique to Queen Mother of the West, up through Emperor Shun, who transmitted whistling to Yu the Great, "after whom the art declined. It revived with the Immortal of the Jin dynasty Sun Gong of Taihang Mountains. Sun found the Way (adopted the Daoist rule of life) and disappeared. Ruan Sizong had a smattering of the art but after him it was quite lost, and whistling was no longer heard."

Two Xiaozhi sections describe whistling tunes attributed to Sun Deng and Ruan Ji, "Sumen Mountain" (11) and "The Loose Rhymes of Ruan" (13). "Sumen [Mountain]" 蘇門 retells the story of Ruan Ji visiting Sun Deng, referred to as the Daoist master living on Sumen, like the Shishuo xinyu above.

The 'Su Men' was composed by the Taoist Immortal Recluse, who lived in the Su Men Mountains (of Honan). The Holy One transmitted, he did not make it. The Immortal transmitted (the music of) Kuang Ch'eng and Wu Kuang 務光 in order to rejoice the spirit and expand the Tao. He did not regard music as the main task. In olden days there were those who roved in Su Men listening to the phoenix' songs. The notes were exquisitely clear, very different from the so-called pretended phoenix. The phoenix makes sounds but humans cannot hear them. How then can the Su Family know the sound of the phoenix? Hereafter, when seeking the sound, bring up the Immortal's whistle. The Immortal's whistle does not stop at fostering the Tao and gratifying the spirits; for indeed, in everyday affairs it brings harmony into the world, and peace in season. In oneself the Tao never dies, in objective matters it assists all that is sacred, and conducts the Five Influences. In the arcana of Nature order prevails. For success in obtaining response (to such efforts) nothing approaches music. The Immortal has evolved the one successful form. As to all wild things whistling is the one thing needful. Yuan Szu-tsung of Chin (Yuan Chi) was a fine whistler. Hearing that the Immortal thought himself his equal, he (Yuan) went to visit him. The Immortal remained seated with his hair in disorder. Yuan bowed repeatedly and inquired after his health. Thrice and again thrice he addressed his (uncivil) host. The Immortal maintained his attitude and made no response. Chi then whistled some score of notes and left. The Immortal, estimating that his guest had not gone far, began to whistle the Ch'ing Chueh [清角] to the extent of four or five movements. But Chi perceived that the mountains and all growing things took on a different sound. Presently came a fierce whirlwind with pelting rain, followed by phoenixes and peacocks in flocks; no one could count them. Chi was alarmed, but also pleased, and he returned home and wrote down the story. He obtained only two-tenths of it, and called it 'Su Men'. This is what they tell there. The motif of the song is lofty mountains and wide marshes, great heights and distances.

The "Loose Rhymes of Ruan" section says,

The 'Loose Rhymes of the Yuan' were really composed by Yuan Chi. The rhymes are free and easy; hence the title. … Both persons of refinement and culture and commonplace and mean folk can listen with appreciation. The majesty of the heavenly principle, purged from all miasmic influence, may mingle with the ordinary music of the Hsuan and the Ch'ih, and the music of Cheng and Yueh enter the ear. Most good whistlers can perform this air. Whenever persons retired in the woods and by springs puff out wind and by accident produce a rhymed sound, if their attempt misses success, it is simply a misfire; if it is completely successful then it remains. The above gives a general idea of the 'Loose Rhymes of the Yuan'.

These ancient instruments are the xun (塤; "a globular ocarina") and chi (篪; "a transverse bamboo flute"), and these Zhou dynasty states were Zheng and Yue.

The "Standard Notes" section (14), mentions Sun Deng and Daoist immortality, "In comparatively modern days, Sun Kung was successful, but people did not listen. As to peaceful notes [平和], they stave off old age and do not allow one to die. These Standard notes are known about, but the notes themselves are lost."

The Xiaozhi "Conclusion" section (15) says, "The conclusion is at the extremities of the [pentatonic] scale, the end of the Great Tao. After the days of Yao and Shun there was some idea of these notes, but the actual notes were lost." It also dismisses the preface history with mythic whistlers like Queen Mother of the West and accepts the historicity of Sun Deng's and Ruan Ji's whistling.

is extravagant talk, and not usually accepted. But the twelve methods are found in Sun Teng and Yuan Chi, so that we can truly say we have the general purport of Whistling. The Preface also says that Sun Teng did not hand on (the gift) to anyone, and after Yuan Chi it disappeared and was no more heard. … Now the voice of man is the voice of the universe (nature). Man may be ancient or modern, but sound is eternal, never new or old. Now this book is going forth and who knows whether a Sun or Yuan may not appear in some mountains or woods and, that being so, who can say that there is an end to Whistling?

=== Hushao ===
The preeminent Chinese avant-garde author Ge Fei wrote the (1995) Hūshào (忽哨; "Whistling") short story, which is a modern update on the story about Sun and Ruan. Victor Mair, who translated "Whistling" into English, says

An old legend of the celebrated encounter between the two men has Ruan Ji visiting Sun Deng in his hermitage but not receiving any responses to his questions. Thereupon, he withdraws and, halfway up a distant mountain, lets out a loud, piercing whistle. This is followed by Sun Deng's magnificent whistled reply, which inspires Ruan Ji to write the "Biography of Master Great Man," an encomium in praise of the Taoist "true man" that also satirizes the conventional Confucian "gentleman".

Ge Fei's "Whistling" tells how the young, famous poet Ruan Ji regularly came to visit the aged hermit Sun Deng on Su Gate Mountain 蘇門山 in present-day Henan, and play games of weiqi "go". During one go game, Sun was silently pondering how to move a piece, and Ruan surprised him. "When the whistling sound suddenly arose, Sun Deng was totally unprepared for it. The strange, strident sound, mixed with the sounds of the billowing pines, reverberated through the valleys of Su Gate Mountain for a long while without expiring".

After a final game of go, Ruan took his leave from Sun owing to the "prolonged and profound silence that made him feel bored." Sun watches Ruan's silhouette gradually dissolving into the dark green distance,

When the sound of whistling rose beneath the sunny empyrean, Sun Deng shuddered as though it were a bolt out of the blue. Shielding his eyes from the strong light with one hand, he saw Ruan Ji standing on the peak of Su Gate Mountain beneath a solitary tree. Against a backdrop of white clouds like thick cotton fleece, he stood motionless, seeing to wait for Sun Deng's answer. Sun Deng looked all around him, then quietly inserted his thumb and forefinger in his mouth—the extreme frailness of his body and the looseness of his teeth caused him to be unable to produce any sound. The shrill, desolate, plaintive whistle, accompanied by the soughing of the billowing pines, reverberated for a long time in the mountain valleys. It was like the sad wail of the poet who died long ago, penetrating through the barriers of time, continuing up till today, and sinking into the easily awakened dreams of a living person.
