= Tropical Storm Dianmu (2021) =

Pacific tropical storm in 2021

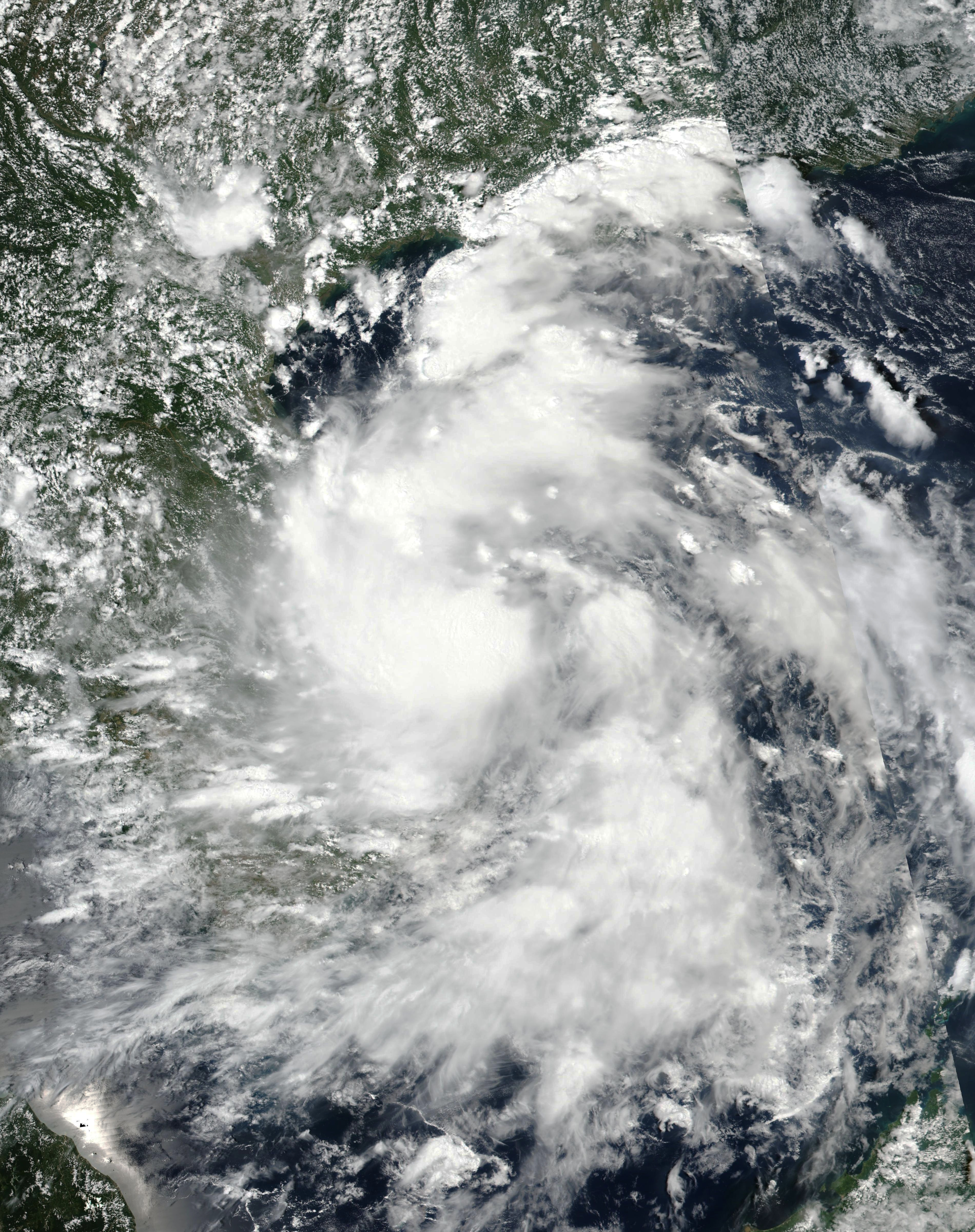
- Tropical Storm Dianmu at peak intensity just before landfall Vietnam on September 23.

Meteorological history
- Formed: September 22, 2021
- Dissipated: September 26, 2021

Tropical storm
- 10-minute sustained (JMA)
- Highest winds: 65 km/h (40 mph)
- Lowest pressure: 1000 hPa (mbar); 29.53 inHg

Tropical storm
- 1-minute sustained (SSHWS/JTWC)
- Highest winds: 65 km/h (40 mph)
- Lowest pressure: 1001 hPa (mbar); 29.56 inHg

Overall effects
- Casualties: 8 dead, 5 missing
- Damage: $16.3 million (2021 USD)
- Areas affected: Vietnam, Laos, Thailand
- IBTrACS
- Part of the 2021 Pacific typhoon season

Tropical Storm Dianmu was a weak tropical cyclone that caused considerable damage over parts of Mainland Southeast Asia during late-September 2021. The fifteenth named storm of the 2021 Pacific typhoon season, Dianmu originated from an area of low-pressure situated in the South China Sea on September 21. Being first monitored by the Joint Typhoon Warning Center, the system rapidly consolidated to a tropical depression on September 22 as it continued to approach Vietnam before strengthening further to a weak tropical storm, with the Japan Meteorological Agency naming it Dianmu. Little intensification occurred before it made landfall on the country with winds of 35 knots (65 km/h; 40 mph). It then rapidly weakened over land and dissipated on September 24 as a tropical cyclone.

Heavy rains resulted in severe flooding in Vietnam and Thailand, as well as affecting Laos during its lifespan. Many livestock and agricultural lands were also affected, along with over 300,000 people. 8 people were killed and 5 were missing due to Dianmu's onslaught. A short-lived storm, after it crossed into the Mainland Southeast Asia, its remnants emerged into the Bay of Bengal and affected the West Bengal.

== Meteorological history ==
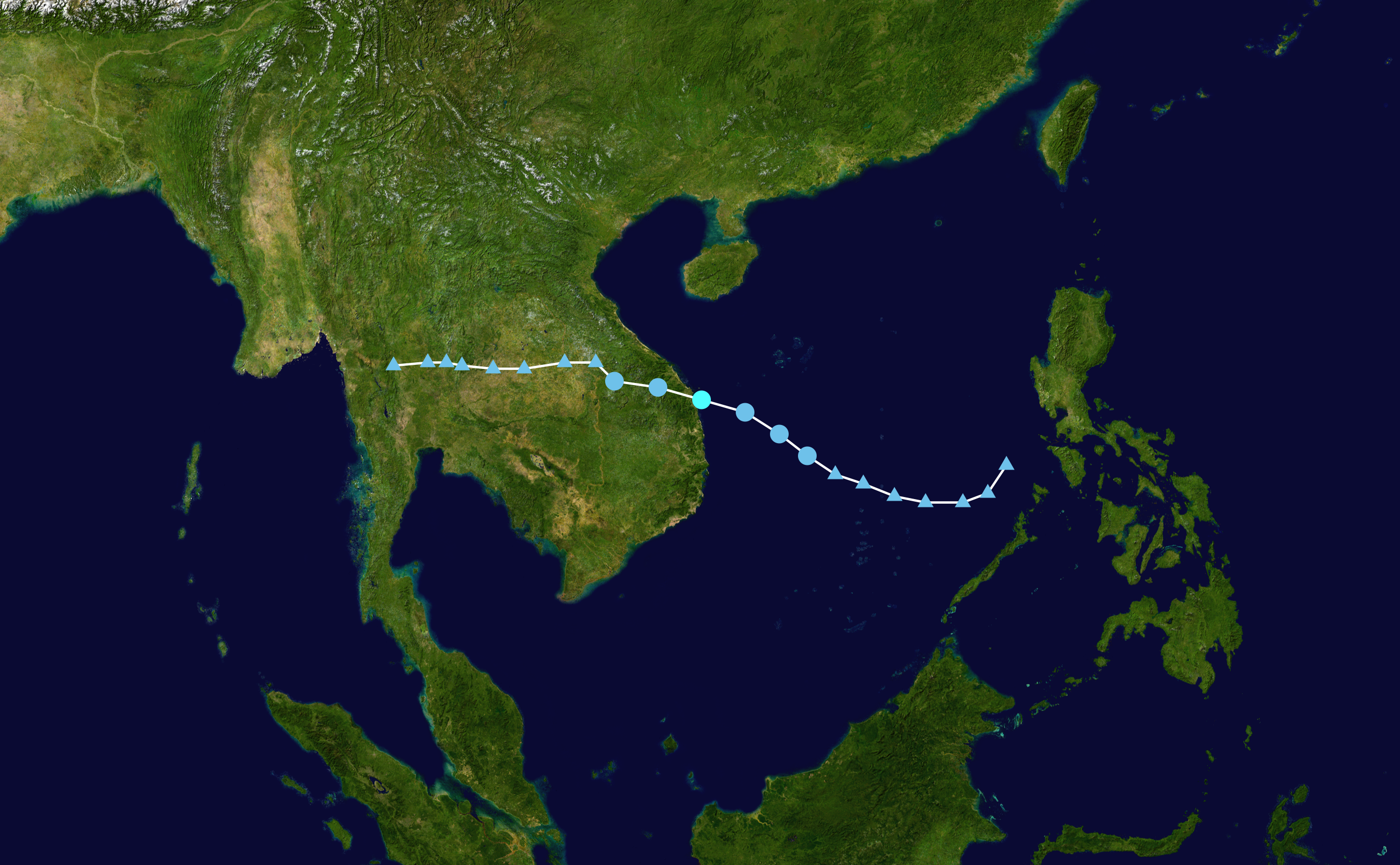
Map plotting the storm's track and intensity, according to the Saffir–Simpson scale Map key Saffir–Simpson scale Tropical depression (≤38 mph, ≤62 km/h) Tropical storm (39–73 mph, 63–118 km/h) Category 1 (74–95 mph, 119–153 km/h) Category 2 (96–110 mph, 154–177 km/h) Category 3 (111–129 mph, 178–208 km/h) Category 4 (130–156 mph, 209–251 km/h) Category 5 (≥157 mph, ≥252 km/h) Unknown Storm type Tropical cyclone Subtropical cyclone Extratropical cyclone, remnant low, tropical disturbance, or monsoon depression

On September 21 at 21:00 UTC, the United States Joint Typhoon Warning Center (JTWC) (Note: The Joint Typhoon Warning Center is a joint United States Navy – United States Air Force task force that issues tropical cyclone warnings for the western Pacific Ocean and other regions.) started to monitor an area of low-pressure in the South China Sea, 168 nmi (311 km; 193 mi) to the northwest of Puerto Princesa, Philippines. At that time, infrared imagery revealed a low-level circulation center being defined and organized with its convection onto its western semicircle. Environmental analysis on the area depicted a favorable path for tropical cyclogenesis, with low wind shear, good outflow and warm 29–30 °C (84–86 °F) sea surface temperatures. However, at that time, the agency only estimated the system's probability of development to “low” as forecast ensembles only indicated a slow formation of the storm in the next 24 hours until 09:30 UTC on the next day, when they raised it to “medium” and subsequently upgraded it to a tropical depression at 15:00 UTC that day. However, the Japan Meteorological Agency (Note: The Japan Meteorological Agency is the official Regional Specialized Meteorological Center for the western Pacific Ocean.) did the same three hours later.

A rapidly organizing system, the depression was steered west-northwestward by the southern periphery of a low to mid-level subtropical ridge to the north. As it neared the coast of Vietnam, the JMA further upgraded the depression to a tropical storm, assigning it the name Dianmu from its naming lists at 06:00 UTC on September 23; (Note: The name Dianmu (Mandarin: 电母, [tiɛn˥˩ mu˧˩˧]) was contributed by China and refers to Dianmu, the goddess of lightning in Mandarin.) the JTWC did the same three hours later based on microwave images and radar coverage. As Dianmu made landfall over the Vietnamese provinces of Thua Thien Hue and Quang Ngai on the early hours of September 24 with winds of 35 knots (65 km/h; 40 mph), the JTWC issued its final bulletin on the storm as it weakened considerably over the country at 15:00 UTC, although it remained a tropical storm upon its final issuance. The JMA, meanwhile, downgraded Dianmu back to a tropical depression twelve hours later before it issued its final warning on the system as it dissipated as a remnant low at 12:00 UTC on September 24. However, its remnants crossed into the Bay of Bengal, where it intensified to a low-pressure area before it moved inland for the second time over West Bengal.

== Impacts ==
Dianmu and its resulting floods killed 8 individuals across Thailand and Vietnam while 5 were reported to have been missing. 73,938 families (369,690 individuals) were affected by the storm and heavy rainfall had caused flooding in these countries.

=== Vietnam ===
On September 23, Le Van Thanh, the National Steering Committee for Natural Disaster Prevention and Control (NSCNDPC) Deputy Prime Minister, conducted an online meeting with the leaders of People's Committee of various districts to discuss the storm's potential impacts. There, preparations discussed included the sending information to the remaining 28 ships in the waters off Quang Binh to Bình Thuận and the COVID-19 testing of vessel crews and sheltering their boats. Evacuation of individuals in Quảng Nam were discussed, along with the advice of the People's Committee of the province to store food and important necessities for 7–10 days. The People's Committee of Da Nang also reminded its people to remain in their houses and not to venture outside while the storm is passing.

On a six-hour period of September 23, 155.4 mm (6.12 in) of rainfall was recorded at Bình Sơn District in Quảng Ngãi and 134.2 mm (5.28 in) on Sơn Hà District in the same province. The system also likely spawned two tornados in the country, one in Núi Thành District, Quảng Nam Province on September 23 in which it caused roof and household damages, including a school. An individual was injured. The other one was in Duy Phước, which damaged another elementary school. Strong winds also uprooted trees and damaged houses in some coastal communities in Nui Thanh while the authorities in Tam Tien evacuated people that are located in damaged houses and other dangerous areas. Residential areas near the Tra Bong River and Quảng Ngãi were flooded while 7 houses collapsed as a result of the storm in Binh Dong, Binh Son district. Ly Son Island suffered damages to 300 hectares of onions and garlic and 10 houses in a village there. A 2,000-ton cargo ship collided with a fishing boat on the coast of Bình Định Province on September 24, leaving 2 fishermen missing out of the three of the latter which was rescued. The vessel was severely damaged following the accident. 2 more children drowned in Tuy Phuoc district, Binh Dinh after they slipped in a lake to collect bottles floating. Another fisherman was reported missing. Damages across the nation reached ₫372 billion (US$16.3 million).

As of September 25, over 2,845 families (14,225 individuals) were affected by Dianmu, 2725 houses and 3,734 ha of agricultural crops and lands being damaged, 201 roads and 5 schools suffering significant destruction and 5,402 livestock being reported to have been killed.

=== Thailand ===
The influence of the remnants of Dianmu, that moved with the monsoon trough that persisted in Northeast and Central regions of the country caused heavy rainfall in its upper regions and 30 more areas in the said zones. 202 mm (8.0 in) of rain was reported in Tak Fa, Nakhon Sawan Province and Phliu, Chanthaburi Province at 182 mm (7.2 in) in a 24-hour period from September 23–24. 10 areas in the country also recorded an increase in water level of its rivers. The levels of dams and reservoirs in 11 locations were also critical. The authorities in the capital Bangkok installed water pumps and barriers to help subside floods. 71,093 households (355,465 persons) were affected with the flash floods. The Chao Phraya River in Bangkok also saw an increase in its water level due to rains. Thai servicemen gathered to fill sandbags to protect the Wat Chaiwatthanaram in Ayutthaya Historical Park. Thai Prime Minister Prayut Chan-o-cha visited the flood-stricken areas, especially Sukhothai on an unknown day as a result. Six individuals in the area were killed by the floods and two more were missing.

=== Elsewhere ===
In Laos, the National Disaster Management Organisastion (NDMO) reported that Dianmu affected several provinces in the country, although they are still continuing to assess the damages from the storm there as of September 28.

== See also ==
- Weather of 2021
- Tropical cyclones in 2021
- Tropical Storm Rai (2016)
