= Yu Shi =

Chinese god of rain

Yu Shi (traditional Chinese: 雨師; simplified Chinese: 雨师; pinyin: Yǔ Shī; lit. 'Master of Rain') is a Chinese spirit or god of rain, also known as or conflated with Red Pine (Chisong, 赤松, or Chisongzi – Master Red Pine), among other names. (Note: For examples, Píng (蓱), Píngyì (蓱翳), Píngyì (屏翳) "Screen Shade", Háopíng (號屏) "Howling Ping", Xuánmíng (玄冥) "Dark Dim") Translations of Yu Shi into English include "Lord of Rain" and "Leader of Rain".

== As Yu Shi ==
Yu Shi in Chinese folk religion and Chinese mythology generally appears in association with Feng Bo, the god of the wind; and Lei Gong, the god of thunder. There are both current religious activities and historical mythical stories associated with Yu Shi. Various references in poetry and popular culture also exist, for example in the Chu ci poems "Tian Wen" and "Yuan You". His consort is Yu Shiqie (雨师妾; 雨師妾; 'Rain Master Concubine').

== As Chisongzi ==
Yu Shi as Chi Songzi.

According to certain versions, a certain Chisongzi (Chinese: 赤松子; pinyin: Chì-Sōng-Zǐ; Wade–Giles: Ch'ih-sung-tzu; lit. 'Master Red Pine') during the reign of Shennong ended a severe drought by sprinkling water from an earthen bowl and was rewarded by being made the Lord of Rain with a dwelling on the mythical Kunlun Mountain.

In another form, Chi Songzi is depicted as a chrysalis of a silkworm who has a concubine whose face is black, holds a snake in each hand, and has a red snake coming out of one ear and a green snake coming out of the other.

== Historical myths ==
Yu Shi (together with Feng Bo) is said to have aided Chiyou in his struggle against the Yellow Emperor during the Battle of Zhuolu, but was defeated by the intervention of the drought goddess Ba.

== Current ==
Yu Shi is worshiped by Han Chinese, Maonan people, and other people in modern southwest China as an important rain god with ritual prayer ceremonies performed to entreat for rain.

== See also ==
- Meng Haoran
- Shangyang (rainbird), a mythical one-legged bird
- Wong Tai Sin
- Yinglong
