= Fengbo (deity) =

Taoist deity of the wind

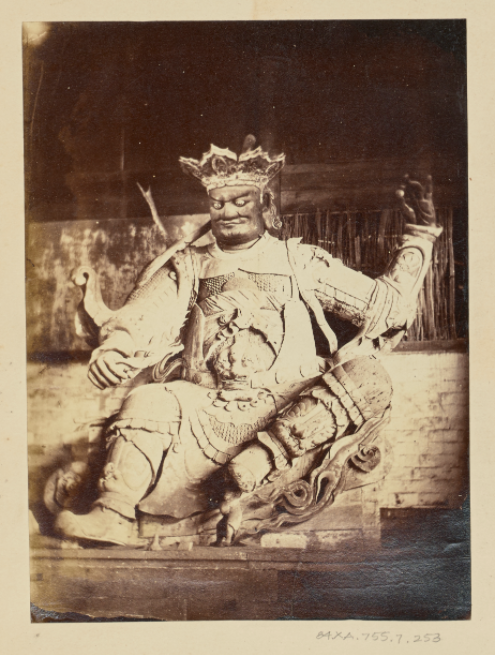
An image of a Fengbo statue c.1860

Fengbo (Chinese: 風伯), also known as Fengshi, is the Taoist deity of the wind. In ancient times, he was depicted as a grotesque deity with the body of a deer, the head of a bird, horns, the tail of a snake, and patterns of a leopard. Eventually, Fengbo was replaced by Feng Po Po. According to the Records of the Grand Historian, he was an object of state ritual from early times, with temples and festivals held in honor of him.

== Mythology of the Ming dynasty ==
In the mythology of the Ming dynasty, Fengbo was also known as the Count of the Wind (Chinese: 風伯方天君, pinyin: Fēng bó fāng tiān jūn). He is depicted as an old man holding a fan, with a yellow cloak, a blue and red cap, and a white beard. He holds a goatskin bag of winds and directs them as he pleases. He is considered a stellar divinity, under the control of the star Ch’i of the Sagittarius constellation.

== Fei Lian ==
Fei Lian is considered the dragon form of Fengbo. There are two origin stories of Fei Lian.

Legends say that Fei Lian was originally one of the supporters of the rebel Chi You, who was defeated by Huang Di. He was transformed into a spiritual monster and stirred up tremendous winds in the southern regions. Emperor Yao sent Shen Yi and three hundred soldiers to quiet the storms and appease Chi You relatives, who were wreaking their vengeance on the people. Shên I ordered the people to spread a long cloth in front of their house and secure it to the ground with stones; this caused the wind to blow against it and change direction. Shen Yi then flew through the wind to the top of a high mountain and they saw a monster, white and yellow in color breathing deeply. Shen Yi understood that the monster was the cause of all these storms and decided to shoot an arrow and try to kill it. The monster ran and hid in a deep cave. Shen Yi followed the monster which drew its sword and dared him to attack the Mother of Winds. Shen Yi bravely decided to face the monster and shot another arrow, this time hitting it in the knee. The monster was finally defeated. It immediately dropped its sword and begged for its life.

Another legend says that Fei Lian appears as a dragon. He was initially one of the tyrant Chou's wicked ministers and could walk with unheard-of swiftness. Both he and his son E Lai, who was so strong that he could tear a tiger and rhinoceros to pieces with his bare hands, were killed while in service of Chou Wang. The legend says that Fei Lien had the body of a stag, about the size of a leopard, with a bird's head, horns, and a snake's tail, and was able to make the wind blow whenever he wished.

== Relationships ==
Some myths say that Fengbo is a subordinate of Chiyou and assists him in his struggle against the Yellow Emperor in the Battle of Zhuolu. He has been known to be friendly with the rain deity Yu Shi. Fengbo, in his dragon form, is considered a troublemaker who needs to be watched by Shen Yi. In the Han Feizi (韓非子) or book of master Han Fei, when Huangdi the Yellow Emperor gathers all the demons at Mount Tai Fengbo sweeps the path.

== See also ==
- Leigong
