= Lingang DRT =

Rapid transit system in Pudong District, Shanghai

Lingang medium transport volume

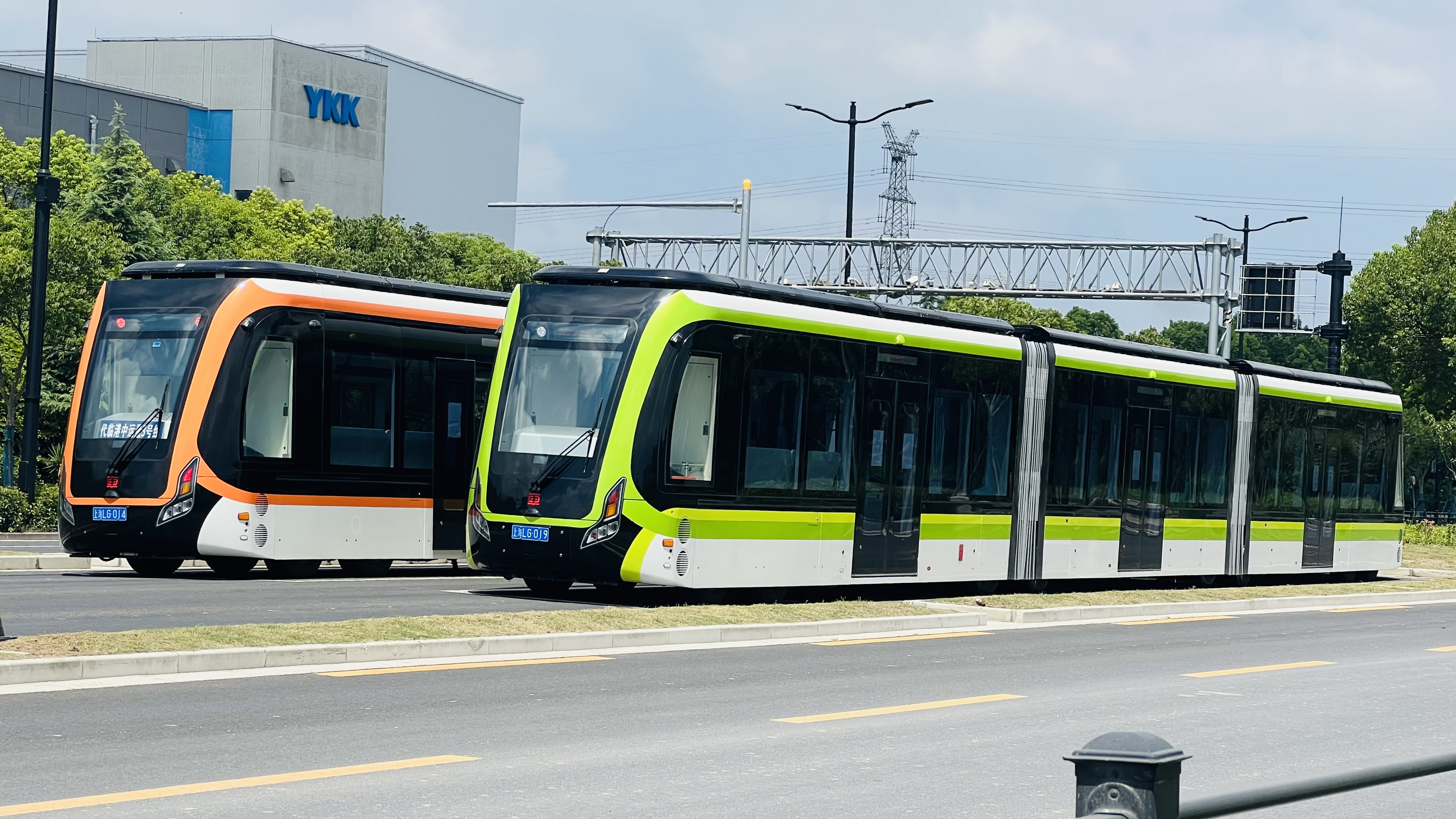
- Two CRRC DRT vehicles at Feidu Road stop in 2023. Note that there are no physical tracks on the roadway.

Overview
- Native name: Chinese: 临港新片区中运量系统
- Area served: Lingang; Fengxian (Line 3)
- Transit type: Autonomous Rapid Transit; Guided bus Bi-articulated bus
- Number of lines: 3
- Line number: Lines 1–3
- Number of stations: 26

Operation
- Began operation: 30 June 2021; 5 years ago
- Operator: Shanghai Lingang Public Transport Company (临港公交)

Technical
- System length: 47.95 km (29.79 mi)
- Top speed: 70 km/h (43 mph)
System map as of 2023

The Lingang Medium Transport Volume (Chinese: 临港中运量; pinyin: Lín gǎng zhōng yùn liàng), also known as Lingang Digital-rail Rapid Transit (Lingang DRT), is a rapid transit system operating within Lingang in Pudong District, Shanghai, China. It started operations on 30 June 2021, and is operated by the Shanghai Lingang Public Transport Company (Chinese: 上海临港公共交通有限公司, abbreviated in Chinese as 临港公交). The system operates as an Autonomous Rapid Transit (ART) system, but conventional bus rapid transit-specification buses currently run on the system too.

The Lingang DRT utilizes the intelligent digital rail transportation system (iDRT) developed by Shanghai Electric Group Intelligent Transportation Technology Co, Ltd, which uses magnetic markers encoded with digital information as virtual tracks and rubber-tired electric vehicles as vehicle carriers. It adopts the operation and control method of modern tramways, and has the advantages of orbitalization, digitalization and intelligentization.

== Lines ==
The Lingang DRT consists of the following lines, all of which charge a flat fare of 2RMB:

- Line 1 (Chinese: 临港中运量1号线), which runs between Dishui Lake station and Hongyin Plaza. It started operations on 30 June 2021.
- Line 2 (Chinese: 临港中运量2号线), which runs in a loop originating from Dishui Lake station, via Lingang Avenue station, Shengang Avenue and Meirenjiao Road before returning to Dishui Lake. It started operations on 28 November 2022.
- Line 3 (Chinese: 临港中运量3号线), which was originally known as T6, runs between Feidu Road station along the route of Line 1 and Caoxuan Road in Fengxian District. It started operations on 5 July 2023.

== History ==
Plans for a rapid transit system went as far back as 2012, when Sun Jianping, then-chairman of the Shanghai Municipal Transport Commission, announced plans to construct multiple modes of rapid transit systems, including Bus Rapid Transit (BRT) and trams in a number of regions, including Shanghai Corniche, Songjiang, Lingang and Hongqiao Business District. A tram system within Lingang was initially announced in 2013, however there were no announcements following that.

In 2016, initial plans to build a medium capacity transit system in Lingang was announced, with the ability to be converted to a large capacity system. This was followed by an announcement that the system will have five lines, all of which are able to connect with Metro Line 16, totalling 82 kilometres (51 mi) in May 2018, after which the number of lines was increased to six with a length of 115 kilometres (71 mi) in April 2020.

In July 2020, the possibility of a digital rail-guided rapid transit system was raised, and this was implemented shortly afterwards. Construction for the first line, Line 1, started in August, with plans to use electricity-powered cars with the possibility of changing to hydrogen-powered ones later. Line 1 began test operations on 1 January 2021, with Vice Secretary-General of Shanghai Municipal Government and Vice Director of Lingang Special Area Zhu Zhisong announcing the official departure of the first test run. Line 1 eventually opened to the public on 30 June 2021.

Construction for the second line, Line 2, commenced in late 2021. Originally scheduled to start operations in the first half of 2022, the opening date was delayed due to the COVID-19 pandemic. Testing for Line 2 began in August 2022, and the line commenced operations on 28 November 2022. The vehicles used on Line 1 are powered by hydrogen, the first such line to do so. Line 2 initially ran between Dishui Lake Metro station and Shuihua Road.

On 1 April 2023, operations were transferred from Lingang Rapid Transit (Chinese: 临港捷运) to Lingang Public Transport (Chinese: 临港公交). Both companies are subsidiaries of Lingang Investment Holdings Group.

The routes of both lines 1 and 2 were amended on 1 July 2023. Under this amendment, Line 1 stops at additional stops, while Line 2 is now running as a loop with the terminus located at Dishui Lake station. On the same day, Sunwin iEV12 electric buses of BRT specifications entered service. These buses have doors on both sides to cater to normal roadside bus stops and stops built for the system at the middle of the road.

Line 3, which was originally named line 6, began operations on 5 July 2023.

== Stations ==
The following is a list of stations along each route of the system:

=== Line 1 ===
Station Name		Transfer
English	Chinese	Transfer
Dishui Lake	滴水湖	16 (Dishui Lake station) Line 2
West Huanhu Road No.3 at Lingang Avenue (Shanghai Astronomy Museum)	环湖西三路临港大道（上海天文馆）	Line 2
East Shengang Avenue (Youth Activity Center)	申港大道东（青少年活动中心）	Line 2
Guzong Road (Shanghai Sixth People's Hospital East)	古棕路（临港六院）	Line 2
Meirenjiao Road (Lingang Center)	美人蕉路（临港中心）	Line 2
Shangyuan Road	上元路	Line 2
Ganlan Road	橄榄路	
Shuihua Road	水华路	
Ganghui Road	港辉路	
Feidu Road	飞渡路	Line 3
Yunduan Road	云端路	
Pengping Road	彭平路	
Hongyin Plaza	鸿音广场	

=== Line 2 ===
Station Name		Transfer
English	Chinese	Transfer
Dishui Lake	滴水湖	16 (Dishui Lake station) Line 1
West Huanhu Road No.3 at Lingang Avenue (Shanghai Astronomy Museum)	环湖西三路临港大道（上海天文馆）	Line 1
East Shengang Avenue (Youth Activity Center)	申港大道东（青少年活动中心）	Line 1
Guzong Road (Shanghai Sixth People's Hospital East)	古棕路（临港六院）	Line 1
Meirenjiao Road (Lingang Center)	美人蕉路（临港中心）	Line 1
Shangyuan Road	上元路	Line 1
Shengang Avenue	申港大道	
Qiqing Road	杞青路	
Lingang Avenue	临港大道	16 (Lingang Avenue station)
Lingang Avenue at West Huanhu Road No. 3 (Shanghai Astronomy Museum)	临港大道环湖西三路（上海天文馆）	
Dishui Lake	滴水湖	16 (Dishui Lake station) Line 1

=== Line 3 ===
Station Name		Transfer
English	Chinese	Transfer
Feidu Road	飞渡路	Line 1
Zhengjia Road	正嘉路	
Xinyang Highway	新杨公路	
Xueliu Road	雪柳路	
Caoxuan Road	草萱路	

== Fleet ==
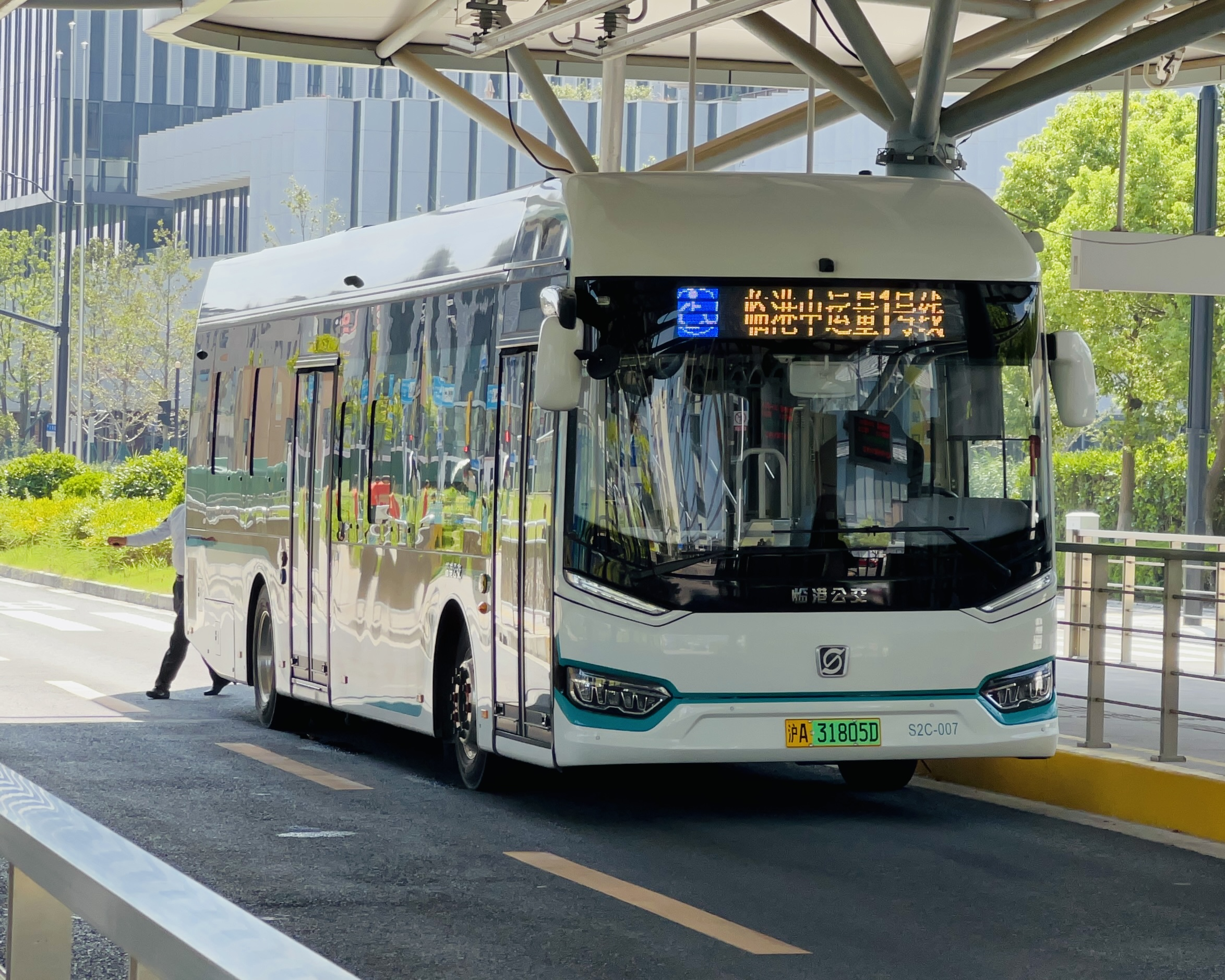
A Sunwin iEV12 bus on Line 1.

Prior to their amendments on 1 July 2023, line 1 used electric Autonomous Rapid Transit vehicles, bearing a modified version of the livery used on regular Lingang Public Transport buses, while line 2 used a hydrogen-powered vehicle with a brown livery. These vehicles are built by CRRC Nanjing Puzhen, and have three carriages with each carriage having one door on each side, totalling three doors per side. Each car has a length of 30 meters, and are capable of carrying 300 passengers, which is around the capacity of three to four regular public buses.

However, since the aforementioned date, both lines 1 and 2 have begun using Sunwin iEV12 (exact model designation: SWB6129BEV95G) buses as their fleet. These buses have doors on both sides.

Line 3 uses vehicles that are similar in specifications to line 2, but with a green livery instead of brown.

== Reception ==
The system has been noted by Shanghai media Wenhui Bao as one of the successes for the exportation of the DRT technology to foreign countries. In April 2023, CRRC Nanjing Puzhen began to produce DRT vehicles for line 5 of the Metrorrey system in Monterrey, Mexico. The vehicles were unveiled on 29 October that year, and began a one year trial in Monterrey.

A report by Shanghai Observer in May 2023 found that vehicles on line 1 were "unusually bumpy" and slow. According to an interviewee, a trip from the town of Nicheng to Dishui Lake, which would normally take 20 minutes by car and 40 minutes by bus, instead took over one hour by taking line 1. In addition, the arrival timing display was found to be extremely inaccurate. The system has also been plagued by low ridership, with only 70 people taking one trip of line 1 at its peak, and the remaining trips averaging at less than 30 passengers. Several car lanes were converted so that they were restricted to the system only; this change of use worsened traffic around the region.

During a visit to Shanghai in October 2023, Hong Kong politician Ngan Man-yu visited the Lingang DRT system. He noted that with a high capacity of 300 people, the ability to navigate mountainous terrains and remain unaffected by adverse weather conditions, a DRT system could be suitable for use on the future East Kowloon line.
