= Dishui Lake =

Artificial lake in Pudong, Shanghai

- 滴水湖 (Chinese)
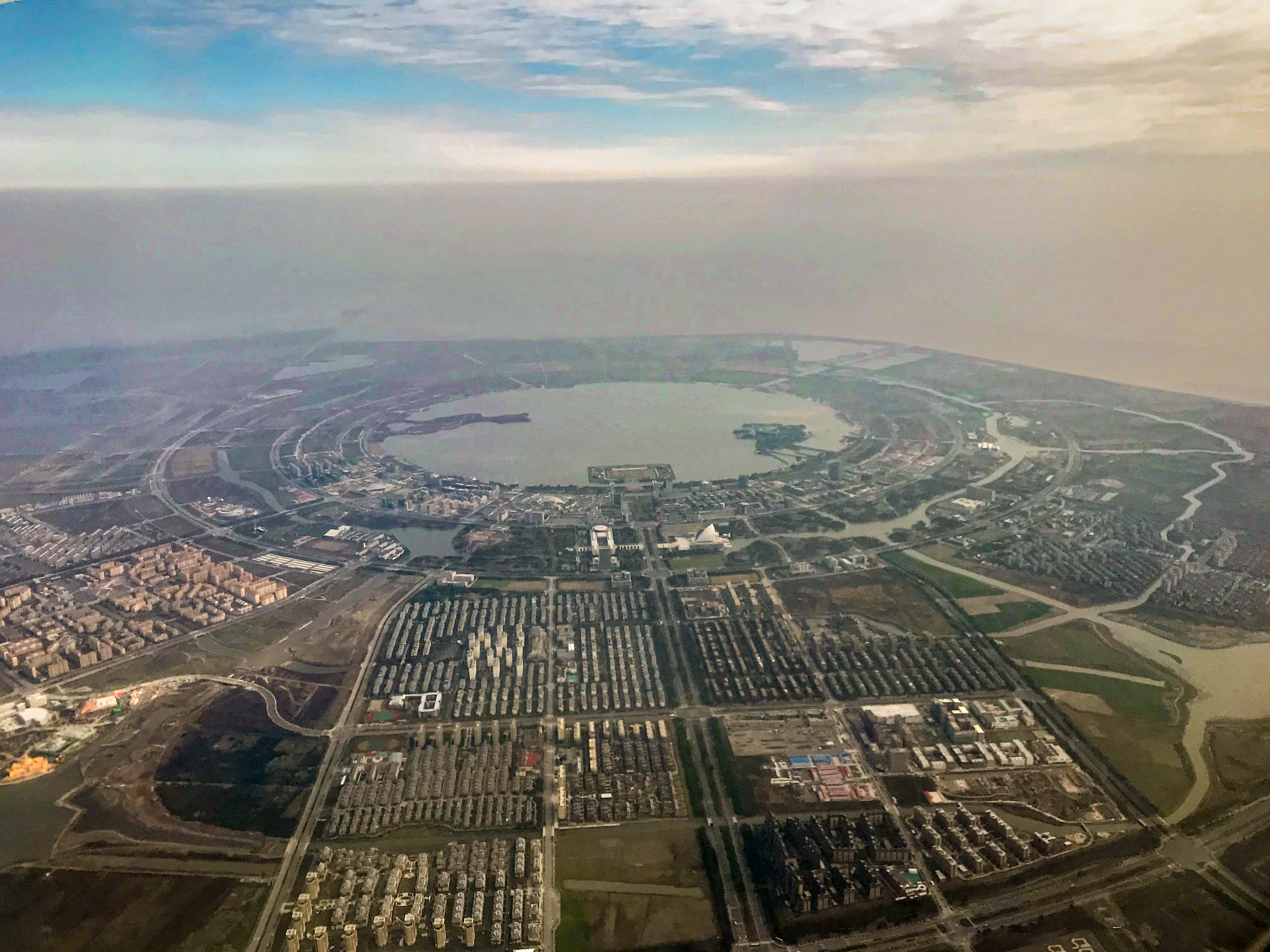
- Bird's-eye view of the lake
- Interactive map of Dishui Lake
- Location: Nanhui New City, Pudong, Shanghai
- Coordinates: 30°53′53.5992″N 121°56′23.604″E
- Type: Artificial lake
- Primary inflows: Huangpu River
- Primary outflows: East China Sea
- Built: June 2002
- First flooded: October 2003
- Max. length: 2.6 km (1.6 mi) (diameter)
- Surface area: 5.66 km^{2} (2.19 sq mi)
- Average depth: 6.2 m (20 ft)
- Islands: 3

Dishui Lake (Chinese: 滴水湖; pinyin: Dīshuǐhú; lit. 'Droplet Lake') is a circular artificial lake in Nanhui New City, Pudong, Shanghai.

== History ==
Construction began in June 2002, along with nearby Yangshan Port and other facilities in Nanhui. Excavation was completed 15 months later, and water from Dazhi River was rerouted in October 2003.

== Attractions ==
=== Metro ===
Dishui Lake is adjacent to Line 16's terminal station, Dishui Lake station, which is served by local, express and non-stop trains.

== See also ==
- Shanghai L+SNOW
