= Heshahangcheng station =

Shanghai Metro station

Heshahangcheng 鹤沙航城
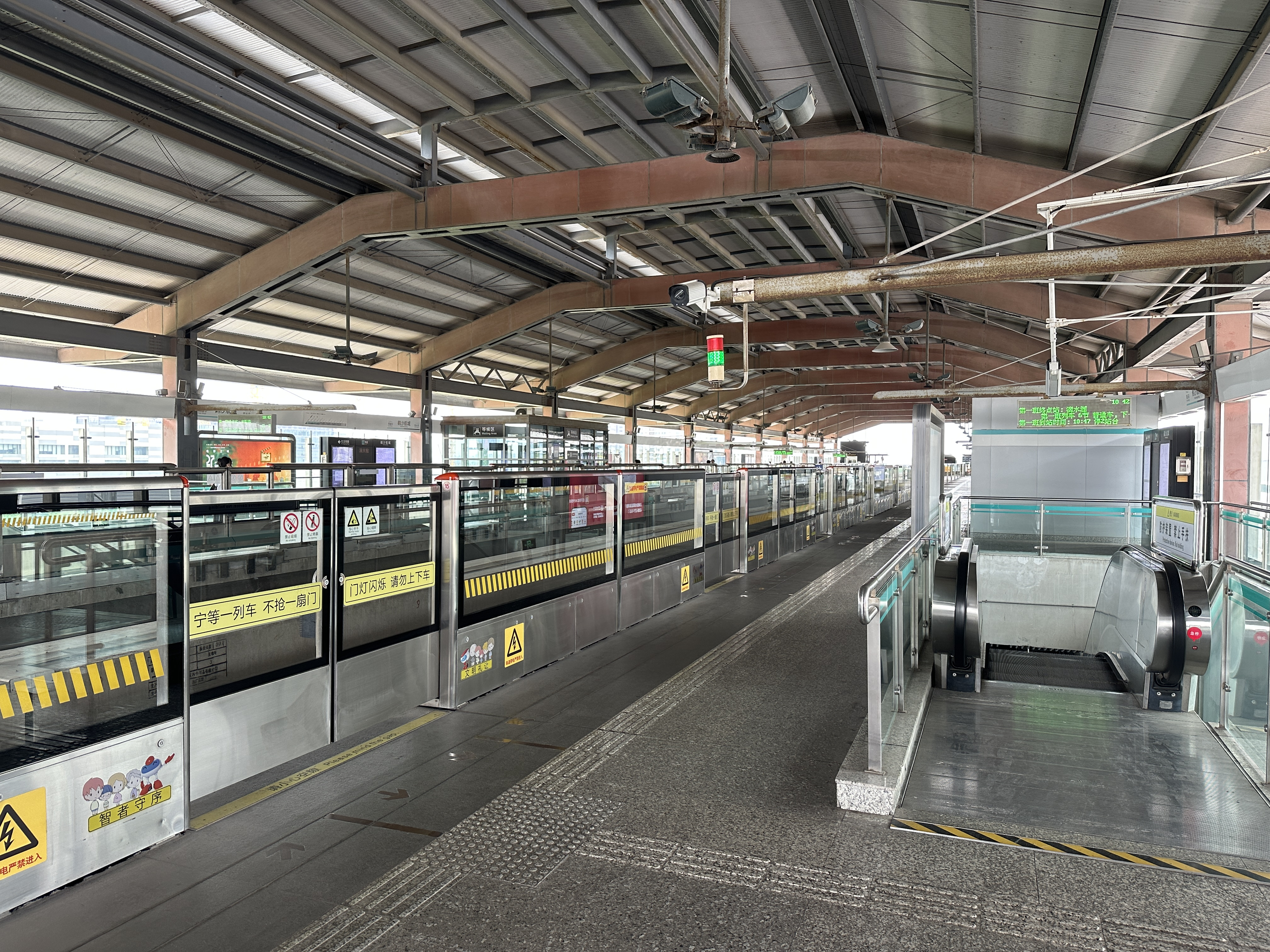
- Station platform

General information
- Location: Pudong New Area, Shanghai; China
- Coordinates: 31.0774°N 121.6097°E
- Line: Line 16
- Platforms: 2 (2 side platforms)
- Tracks: 2

Construction
- Structure type: Elevated
- Accessible: Yes

History
- Opened: 29 December 2013

Services
| Preceding station | Shanghai Metro | Following station |
|---|---|---|
| East Zhoupu towards Longyang Road | Line 16 | East Hangtou towards Dishui Lake |
Location
- Location within Shanghai

Heshahangcheng (simplified Chinese: 鹤沙航城; traditional Chinese: 鶴沙航城; pinyin: Hèshāhángchéng) is a Shanghai Metro station in Pudong New Area, Shanghai. It is on Line 16 between East Zhoupu and East Hangtou stations. It opened on 29 December 2013.

== Exit list ==
- Exit 1: Helei Road
