= East Zhoupu station =

Shanghai Metro station

East Zhoupu 周浦东
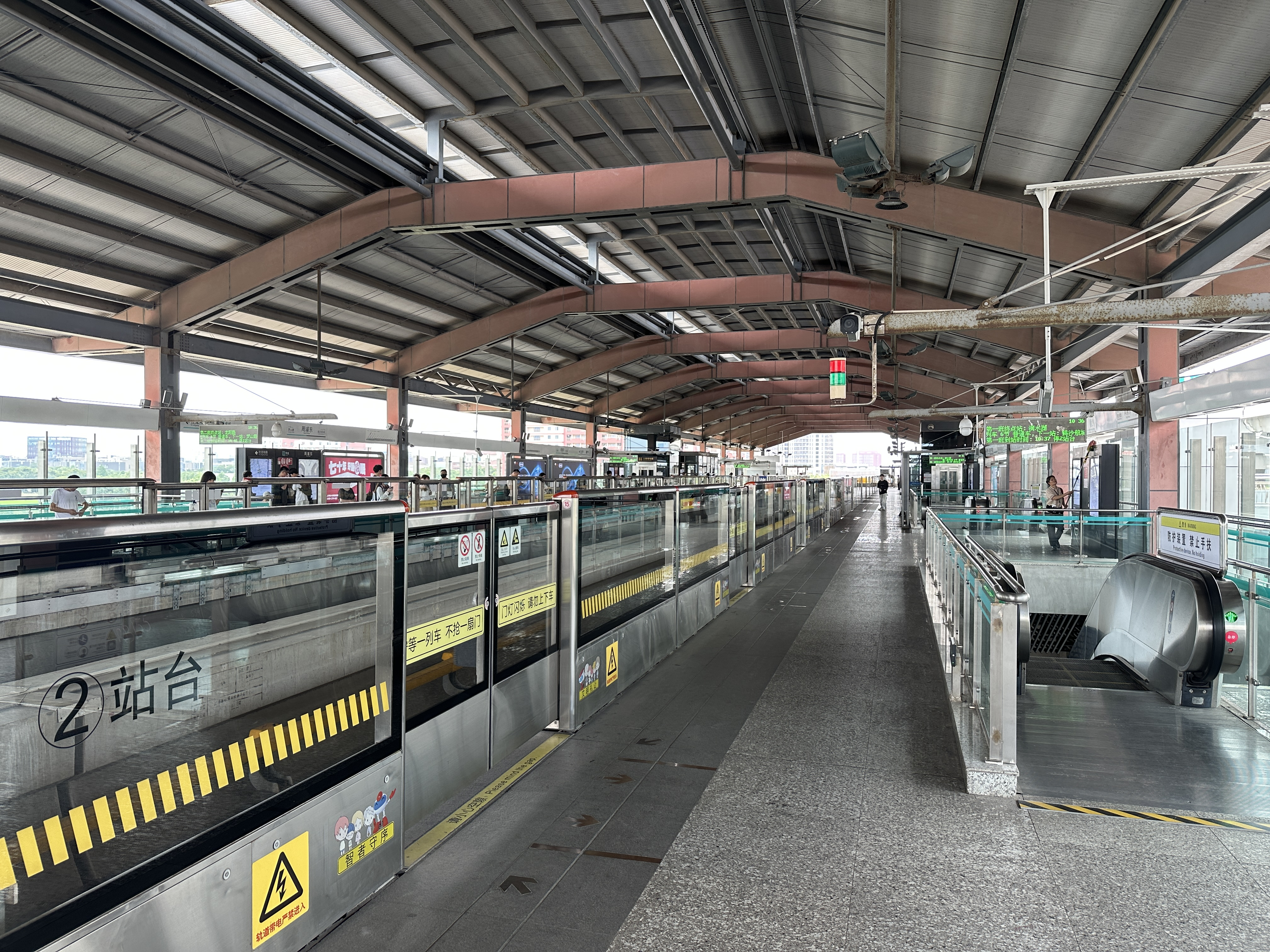
- Station platform

General information
- Location: S3 Hufeng Expressway at Zhoudeng Highway (周邓公路); Zhoupu, Pudong, Shanghai; China
- Coordinates: 31.1090°N 121.6064°E
- Line: Line 16
- Platforms: 2 (2 side platforms)
- Tracks: 2

Construction
- Structure type: Elevated
- Accessible: Yes

History
- Opened: 29 December 2013

Services
| Preceding station | Shanghai Metro | Following station |
|---|---|---|
| Luoshan Road towards Longyang Road | Line 16 | Heshahangcheng towards Dishui Lake |
Location
- Location within Shanghai

East Zhoupu (simplified Chinese: 周浦东; traditional Chinese: 周浦東; pinyin: Zhōupǔ Dōng) is a station on Line 16 of the Shanghai Metro. It opened on 29 December 2013 as part of the first section of Line 16 from Luoshan Road to Dishui Lake.
