= Lingang Avenue station =

Shanghai Metro station

Lingang Avenue 临港大道
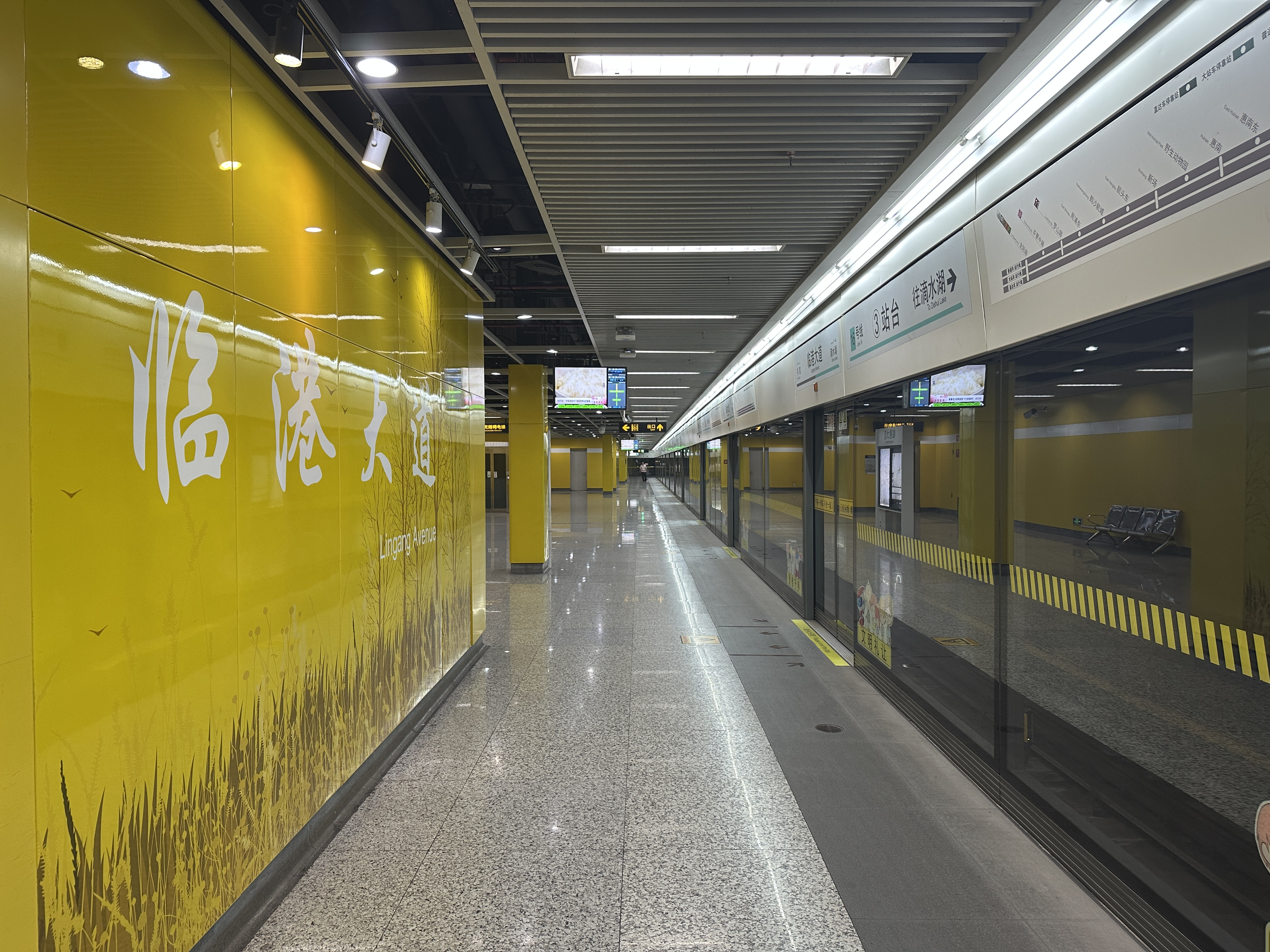
- Station platform

General information
- Location: Lingang Avenue (临港大道) and Hucheng Ring Road (沪城环路); Nanhui New City, Pudong, Shanghai; China
- Coordinates: 30.92591°N 121.90668°E
- Line: Line 16
- Platforms: 3 (1 island platform and 1 side platform)
- Tracks: 3

Construction
- Structure type: Underground
- Accessible: Yes

History
- Opened: 29 December 2013

Services
Preceding station	Shanghai Metro	Following station
Shuyuan towards Longyang Road	Line 16	Dishui Lake Terminus
Huinan towards Longyang Road	Line 16 Express service	Dishui Lake Terminus
Location
- Location within Shanghai

Lingang Avenue (simplified Chinese: 临港大道; traditional Chinese: 臨港大道; pinyin: Língǎng Dàdào) is a station on Line 16 of the Shanghai Metro in Shanghai, China. The station is located in the center of Nanhui New City. From here, the Universities Shanghai Maritime University and Shanghai Ocean University can be reached by bus. It opened on 29 December 2013 as part of the first section of Line 16 from Luoshan Road to Dishui Lake.

Since 1 October 2018, to accommodate the openings of Haichang Ocean Park which stands close to the station, all trains served (including rapid services, except express services) stop at this station.

The station has 3 tracks, one island platform, and one side platform. The inner island platform is not in service. Trains heading to Longyang Road use the outer island platform, whilst trains towards Dishui Lake use the side platform. This station utilizes the same platform layout as one of its neighbouring stations, Shuyuan, on the same line.
