= Line 16 (Shanghai Metro) =

Metro line in Shanghai, China

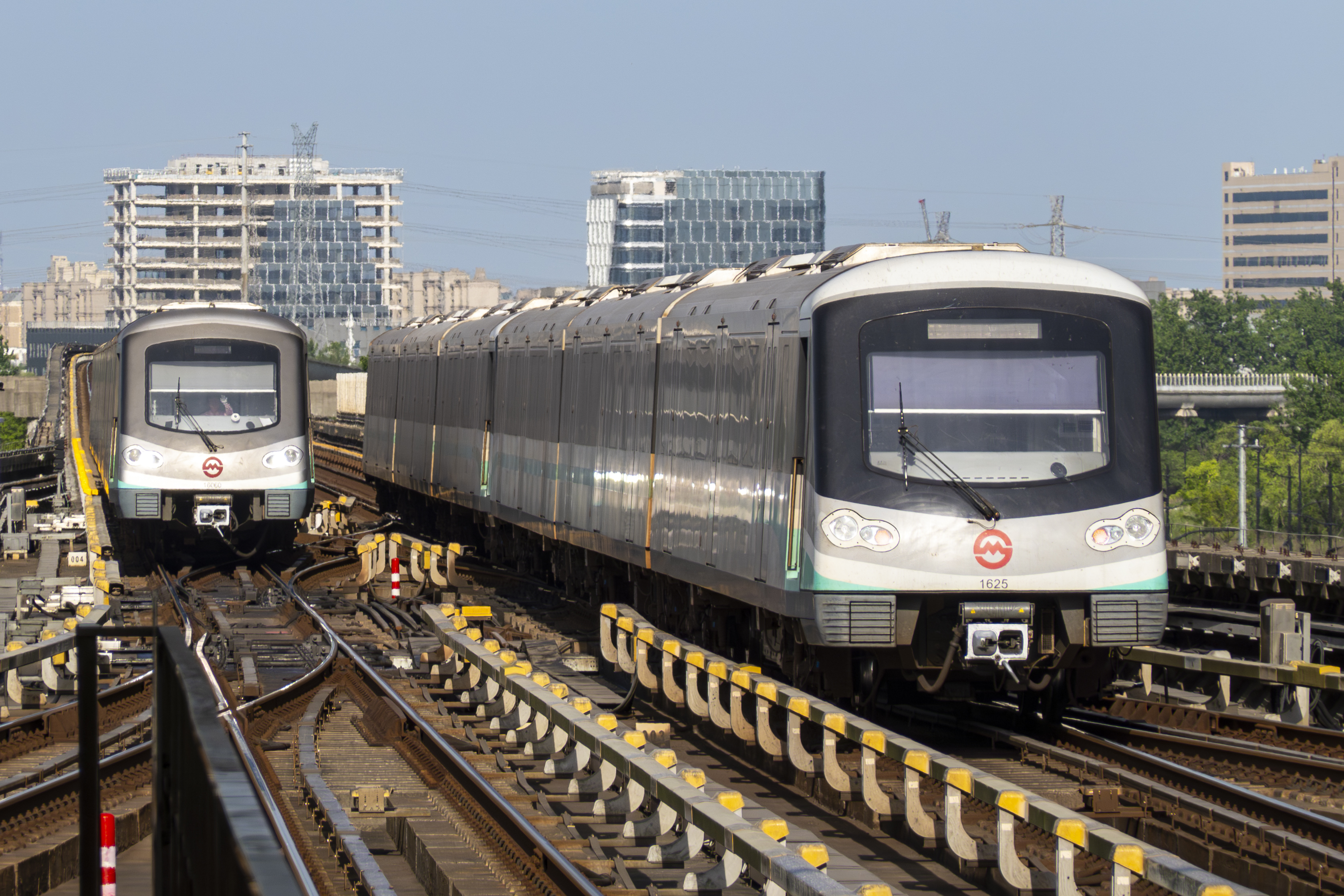
- 16A01 and 16A02 trainsets at Longyang Road station

Overview
- Other name(s): R3s (planned name); South section of line 11 (planned name); Line 21 (planned name between 29 January and 1 March 2010); Lingang line (Chinese: 临港线); Excursion line (nickname)
- Native name: 上海地铁16号线
- Status: Operational
- Owner: Shanghai Rail Transit Line 16 Development Co., Ltd.
- Locale: Pudong district, Shanghai, China
- Termini: Longyang Road; Dishui Lake
- Stations: 13

Service
- Type: Rapid transit
- System: Shanghai Metro
- Operator: Shanghai Maglev Transportation Development Co., Ltd.
- Depot(s): Yebei Depot; Chuanyanghe Yard
- Rolling stock: 16A01; 16A02
- Daily ridership: 254,000 (2019 Peak)

History
- Work began: March 22, 2010; 16 years ago
- Opened: December 29, 2013; 12 years ago
- Last extension: December 28, 2014; 11 years ago

Technical
- Line length: 58.96 km (36.64 mi)
- Num of tracks: 2 (passing loops at some stations)
- Character: Elevated: Longyang Road↔Huinan & Huinan↔Lingang Avenue 44.5km 10 stations; Underground: Huinan & Lingang Avenue ↔ Dishui Lake: 10.3km 3 stations.
- Track gauge: 1,435 mm (4 ft 8 1/2 in)
- Electrification: Third rail, 1.5kV DC (overhead line wire in depot)
- Operating speed: 120 km/h (75 mph); Average speed: 63.1 km/h (39 mph) (local service); 75.4 km/h (47 mph) (rapid service); 102 km/h (63 mph) (express service);
- Signalling: ALSTOM Urbalis CBTC
Route map
To scale geographic map:

Line 16 is a rapid transit line serving the south-eastern suburban areas of Shanghai. The line was formerly known as the Lingang line (Chinese: 临港线; pinyin: Língǎng xiàn). It was originally designated as Line 21 and was planned as the south part of line 11. The line runs entirely in Pudong New Area, starting from Longyang Road, via Shanghai Wild Animal Park, Huinan Town, ending at Dishui Lake in Nanhui New City. The line is 59 km (37 mi) long and has 13 stations of which three are underground and the rest elevated. Construction begun in early 2009, and the line opened on 29 December 2013. The second phase was completed at the end of 2014.

The design speed of Line 16 is 120 km/h (75 mph), and the actual maximum operating speed in the above-ground section is about 100 km/h (62 mph). Line 16 is susceptible to further speed limits due to heavy fog, due to the high operating speed of the line requiring longer sight distances. The line is colored aqua on system maps.

== History ==
The new line was originally designated as Line 21. Shanghai Metro Authorities have since changed this to Line 16, and will integrate into the planned transport hub of Lingang city.

Shanghai Metro Line 16 opening history
Segment	Commenced	Opened	Length	Station(s)	Name	Investment
Luoshan Road — Dishui Lake	22 Mar 2010	29 Dec 2013	52.850 km (32.84 mi)	11	Initial phase	¥18.16 billion
Longyang Road — Luoshan Road	22 Mar 2010	28 Dec 2014	6.112 km (3.80 mi)	2	Initial phase (northern extension)	¥18.16 billion

== Stations ==
=== Service pattern ===
Line 16 is the only line in the Shanghai Metro planned to feature different stopping services, with a rapid service stopping only at Longyang Road, Luoshan Road, Xinchang, Huinan, and Dishui Lake stations. Between 30 January 2014 and 21 March 2016, due to insufficient rolling stock and overcrowding of the line, all rapid services were suspended. To further increase capacity, the existing 3-car train sets were to be expanded to full 6-car sets and the rush hour headway was reduced to a minimum of 4 minutes and operated with a mixture of 3-car and 6-car trains. Since 1 October 2018, rapid service trains also stop at Lingang Avenue station on weekends and public holidays. Since 16 November 2018, rapid trains also stop at Lingang Avenue station on weekdays. Express train services started on 18 June 2020, with stops only at the two termini. Express services reduce end to end travel time to 34 minutes and rapid services reduce end to end travel time to 46 minutes (regular services take 55 minutes).

Shanghai Metro Line 16 service routes
EX – express services: Longyang Road ↔ Dishui Lake; R – rapid services: Longyang Road ↔ Dishui Lake; L – local services: Longyang Road ↔ Dishui Lake
Routes			Station name		Connections	Distance			Location	Opening	Platform
EX	R	L	English	Chinese	Connections	km		min	Location	Opening	Platform
●	●	●	Longyang Road	龙阳路	2 7 18 Maglev (Note: Out of system transfer with Shanghai Maglev Train.)	0.00		0	Pudong	28 Dec 2014	Elevated Double Island
｜	｜	●	Middle Huaxia Road	华夏中路	13	4.37		5	Pudong	28 Dec 2014	Elevated Island
｜	●	●	Luoshan Road	罗山路	11	2.67	7.04	8	Pudong	29 Dec 2013	Elevated Island
｜	｜	●	East Zhoupu	周浦东		4.98	12.02	13	Pudong	29 Dec 2013	Elevated Side
｜	｜	●	Heshahangcheng	鹤沙航城		2.62	14.64	16	Pudong	29 Dec 2013	Elevated Side
｜	｜	●	East Hangtou	航头东		2.60	17.24	20	Pudong	29 Dec 2013	Elevated double Island with passing loops
｜	●	●	Xinchang	新场		3.60	20.84	23	Pudong	29 Dec 2013	Elevated Side
｜	｜	●	Wild Animal Park	野生动物园		4.84	25.68	28	Pudong	29 Dec 2013	Elevated double Island with passing loops
｜	●	●	Huinan	惠南		6.05	31.73	33	Pudong	29 Dec 2013	Underground Side
｜	｜	●	East Huinan	惠南东		5.79	37.52	38	Pudong	29 Dec 2013	Elevated double Island with passing loops
｜	｜	●	Shuyuan	书院		10.61	48.13	46	Pudong	29 Dec 2013	Elevated Side & Island with single passing loop
｜	●	●	Lingang Avenue	临港大道		7.08	55.21	52	Pudong	29 Dec 2013	Underground Side & Island with single passing loop
●	●	●	Dishui Lake	滴水湖		2.59	57.80	55	Pudong	29 Dec 2013	Underground Double Island

=== Important stations ===
The line has the unofficial nickname "excursion line" as it connects several scenic spots: Xinchang Ancient Town, Shanghai Wildlife Park, Nanhui Taohua Village, Guzhong Garden, Shanghai Academy of Learning, Shanghai Flower Port, and Dishui Lake

- Longyang Road: Interchange station with Lines 2, 7 and 18, also interchange with Shanghai maglev train.
- Lingang Avenue: Haichang Ocean Park; buses to Shanghai Maritime University and Shanghai Ocean University.
- Dishui Lake: Dishui Lake (largest artificial lake in China); China Maritime Museum and Shanghai Astronomy Museum.

=== Future expansion ===
The "China (Shanghai) Pilot Free Trade Zone Lingang New Area Territorial and Spatial Master Plan (2019-2035) (Draft for Review)" proposed that in the future, Line 16 will pass through the Dishui Lake and arrive at the future Nanhui New Town hub.

== Headways ==
As of September 28th, 2026

Shanghai Metro Line 16 headway
Time		Longyang Road – Dishui Lake
Monday – Friday (Working Days)
AM peak	7:30–10:30	About 3 min and 30 sec
Off-peak	10:30–16:30	About 7 min
PM peak	16:30–21:30	About 4 min
Other hours	Before 7:30 After 21:30	8 – 12 min
Saturday and Sunday (Weekends)
Peak	7:00–20:30	About 5 min
Other hours	Before 7:00 After 20:30	5 – 10 min

=== Rapid Services ===
==== Weekday ====
- Longyang Road→Dishui Lake

Stopover	First	Second	Third	Fourth	Fifth	Sixth	Seventh	Eighth	Ninth	Tenth	Eleventh	Twelfth	Thirteenth
Longyang Road	07:00	10:00	11:00	12:00	13:00	14:00	15:00	16:00	17:00	18:00	19:00	20:00	21:00
Luoshan Road	07:06	10:06	11:06	12:06	13:06	14:06	15:06	16:06	17:06	18:06	19:06	20:06	21:06
Xinchang	07:18	10:18	11:18	12:18	13:18	14:18	15:18	16:18	17:18	18:18	19:18	20:18	21:18
Huinan	07:26	10:26	11:26	12:26	13:26	14:26	15:26	16:26	17:26	18:26	19:26	20:26	21:26
Lingang Avenue	07:43	10:43	11:43	12:43	13:43	14:43	15:43	16:43	17:43	18:43	19:43	20:43	21:43
Dishui Lake	07:46 （Arrival）	10:46 （Arrival）	11:46 （Arrival）	12:46 （Arrival）	13:46 （Arrival）	14:46 （Arrival）	15:46 （Arrival）	16:46 （Arrival）	17:46 （Arrival）	18:46 （Arrival）	19:46 （Arrival）	20:46 （Arrival）	21:46 （Arrival）

- Dishui Lake→Longyang Road

Stopover	First	Second	Third	Fourth	Fifth	Sixth	Seventh	Eighth	Ninth	Tenth	Eleventh	Twelfth
Dishui Lake	07:00	10:00	11:00	12:00	13:00	14:00	15:00	16:00	17:00	19:00	20:00	21:00
Lingang Avenue	07:03	10:03	11:03	12:03	13:03	14:03	15:03	16:03	17:03	19:03	20:03	21:03
Huinan	07:21	10:21	11:21	12:21	13:21	14:21	15:21	16:21	17:21	19:21	20:21	21:21
Xinchang	07:29	10:29	11:29	12:29	13:29	14:29	15:29	16:29	17:29	19:29	20:29	21:29
Luoshan Road	07:41	10:41	11:41	12:41	13:41	14:41	15:41	16:41	17:41	19:41	20:41	21:41
Longyang Road	07:46 （Arrival）	10:46 （Arrival）	11:46 （Arrival）	12:46 （Arrival）	13:46 （Arrival）	14:46 （Arrival）	15:46 （Arrival）	16:46 （Arrival）	17:46 （Arrival）	19:46 （Arrival）	20:46 （Arrival）	21:46 （Arrival）

==== Weekends & Holidays ====
- Longyang Road→Dishui Lake

Stopover	First	Second	Third	Fourth	Fifth	Sixth	Seventh	Eighth	Ninth	Tenth	Eleventh	Twelfth	Thirteenth	Fourteenth	Fifteenth
Longyang Road	07:00	08:00	09:00	10:00	11:00	12:00	13:00	14:00	15:00	16:00	17:00	18:00	19:00	20:00	21:00
Luoshan Road	07:06	08:06	09:06	10:06	11:06	12:06	13:06	14:06	15:06	16:06	17:06	18:06	19:06	20:06	21:06
Xinchang	07:18	08:18	09:18	10:18	11:18	12:18	13:18	14:18	15:18	16:18	17:18	18:18	19:18	20:18	21:18
Huinan	07:26	08:26	09:26	10:26	11:26	12:26	13:26	14:26	15:26	16:26	17:26	18:26	19:26	20:26	21:26
Lingang Avenue	07:43	08:43	09:43	10:43	11:43	12:43	13:43	14:43	15:43	16:43	17:43	18:43	19:43	20:43	21:43
Dishui Lake	07:46 （Arrival）	08:46 （Arrival）	09:46 （Arrival）	10:46 （Arrival）	11:46 （Arrival）	12:46 （Arrival）	13:46 （Arrival）	14:46 （Arrival）	15:46 （Arrival）	16:46 （Arrival）	17:46 （Arrival）	18:46 （Arrival）	19:46 （Arrival）	20:46 （Arrival）	21:46 （Arrival）

- Dishui Lake→Longyang Road

Stopover	First	Second	Third	Fourth	Fifth	Sixth	Seventh	Eighth	Ninth	Tenth	Eleventh	Twelfth	Thirteenth	Fourteenth	Fifteenth
Dishui Lake	07:00	08:00	09:00	10:00	11:00	12:00	13:00	14:00	15:00	16:00	17:00	18:00	19:00	20:00	21:00
Lingang Avenue	07:03	08:03	09:03	10:03	11:03	12:03	13:03	14:03	15:03	16:03	17:03	18:03	19:03	20:03	21:03
Huinan	07:21	08:21	09:21	10:21	11:21	12:21	13:21	14:21	15:21	16:21	17:21	18:21	19:21	20:21	21:21
Xinchang	07:29	08:29	09:29	10:29	11:29	12:29	13:29	14:29	15:29	16:29	17:29	18:29	19:29	20:29	21:29
Luoshan Road	07:41	08:41	09:41	10:41	11:41	12:41	13:41	14:41	15:41	16:41	17:41	18:41	19:41	20:41	21:41
Longyang Road	07:46 （Arrival）	08:46 （Arrival）	09:46 （Arrival）	10:46 （Arrival）	11:46 （Arrival）	12:46 （Arrival）	13:46 （Arrival）	14:46 （Arrival）	15:46 （Arrival）	16:46 （Arrival）	17:46 （Arrival）	18:46 （Arrival）	19:46 （Arrival）	20:46 （Arrival）	21:46 （Arrival）

=== Direct Services ===
Direct Train operates on Weekdays only (Except Holiday)

- Longyang Road→Dishui Lake

Stopover	First	Second	Third
Longyang Road	07:30	07:45	12:30
Dishui Lake	08:04 （Arrival）	08:19 （Arrival）	13:04 （Arrival）

- Dishui Lake→Longyang Road

Stopover	First	Second	Third
Dishui Lake	12:30	17:20	18:00
Longyang Road	13:04 （Arrival）	17:54 （Arrival）	18:34 （Arrival）

== Technology ==
=== Rolling stock ===
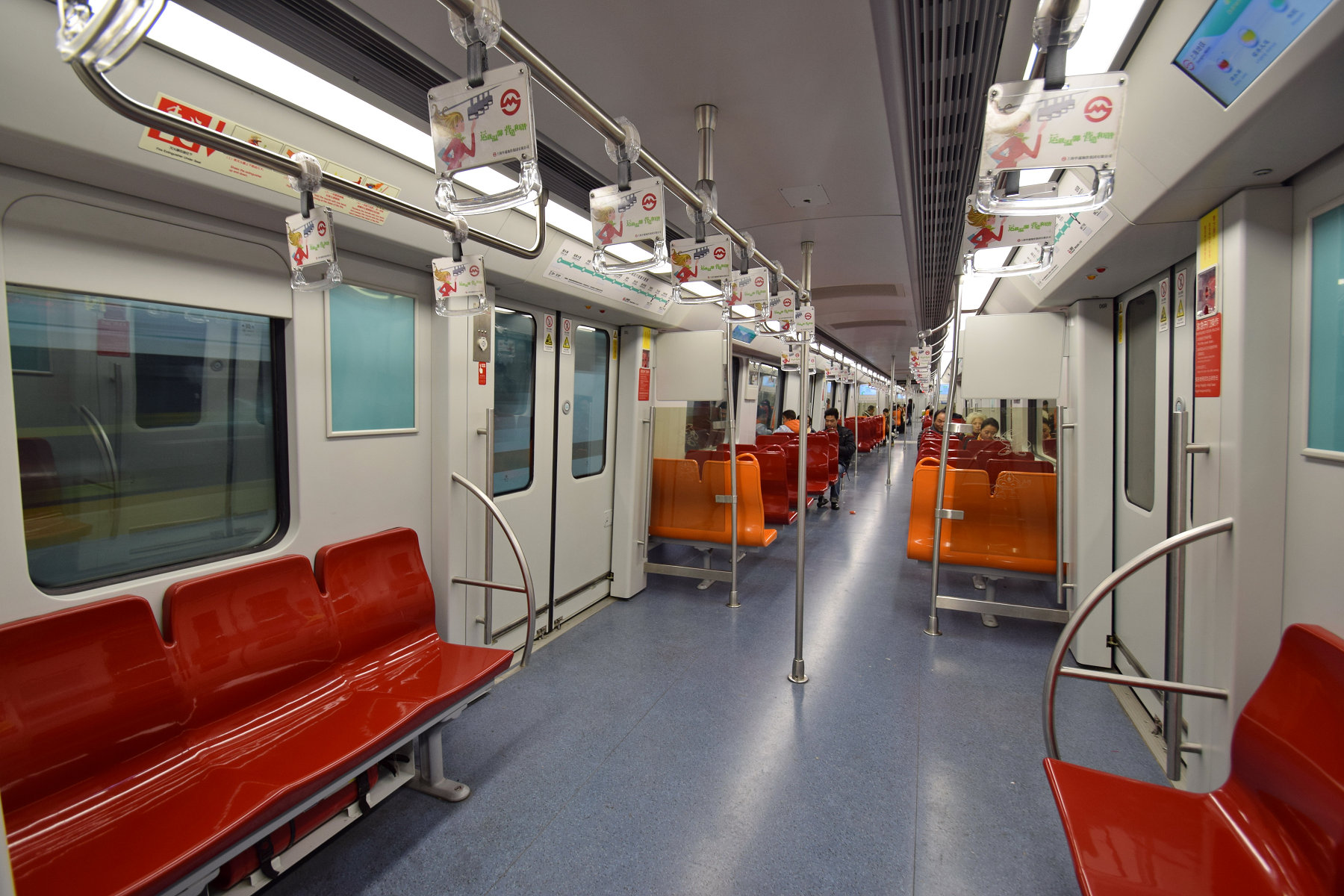
16A01's interior

Contrary to other A-class trains with 5 doors on each side of a carriage, the Class A trains for Line 16 only have 3 doors due to the line's more suburban nature. The 16A01 trains initially operated in 3 car formations, leading to huge overcrowding issues upon opening. 16A01 primarily have transverse seating to suit its more suburban role. With the introduction of the 16A02 stocks, 16A01 trains now operate in 3+3 car formations. The 16A02 trains have more standing room and use more longitudinal seating, which will be able to take 200 more passengers than the 3+3 formation of 16A01. A six carriage train has a capacity of 2,378 passengers, 120% more than trains with three carriages. The tapering of the carbody between cars 3 and 4 where the "blind" cabs of the 3+3 set would be to match the dynamic envelope of a 3+3 set. 16A02 offer USB charging.

Shanghai Metro Line 16 rolling stock
Fleet numbers	Manufacturer	Time of manufac- turing	Class	No of car	Assembly (Note: Tc: Trailer with cab; Mp: EMU with pantograph; M: EMU without pantograph.)	Rolling stock	Number	Notes
138	Siemens and CRRC Zhuzhou Locomotive Co., Ltd.	2012–2014	A (Note: Class A trains for Line 16: 23.54 meters long, 3 meters wide, 3.0m in width and 3.8m in height; only three doors on each side per carriage instead of five for standard Class A carriages.)	3	Mcp+M+Mcp=Mcp+M+Mcp	16A01	1601–1646 (160011–161381)	Original name: AC19. Formerly three carriage trains; two trains have been coupled (may decouple in trough hours) to form a six carriage train. Horizontal rows and reversible seats.
90	CRRC Zhuzhou Locomotive Co., Ltd.	2018–2020	A	6	Tc+Mp+M+M+Mp+Tc	16A02	16047–16061 (161391–162281)	USB charging port. Carriages 1, 2, 5, and 6 use tandem seats, while carriages 3 and 4 use horizontal seats. (Note: 16A02 are able to take 200 more passengers than the 16A01 because of different seating arrangements. A six carriage train has a capacity of 2,378 passengers, 120% more than trains with three carriages.)

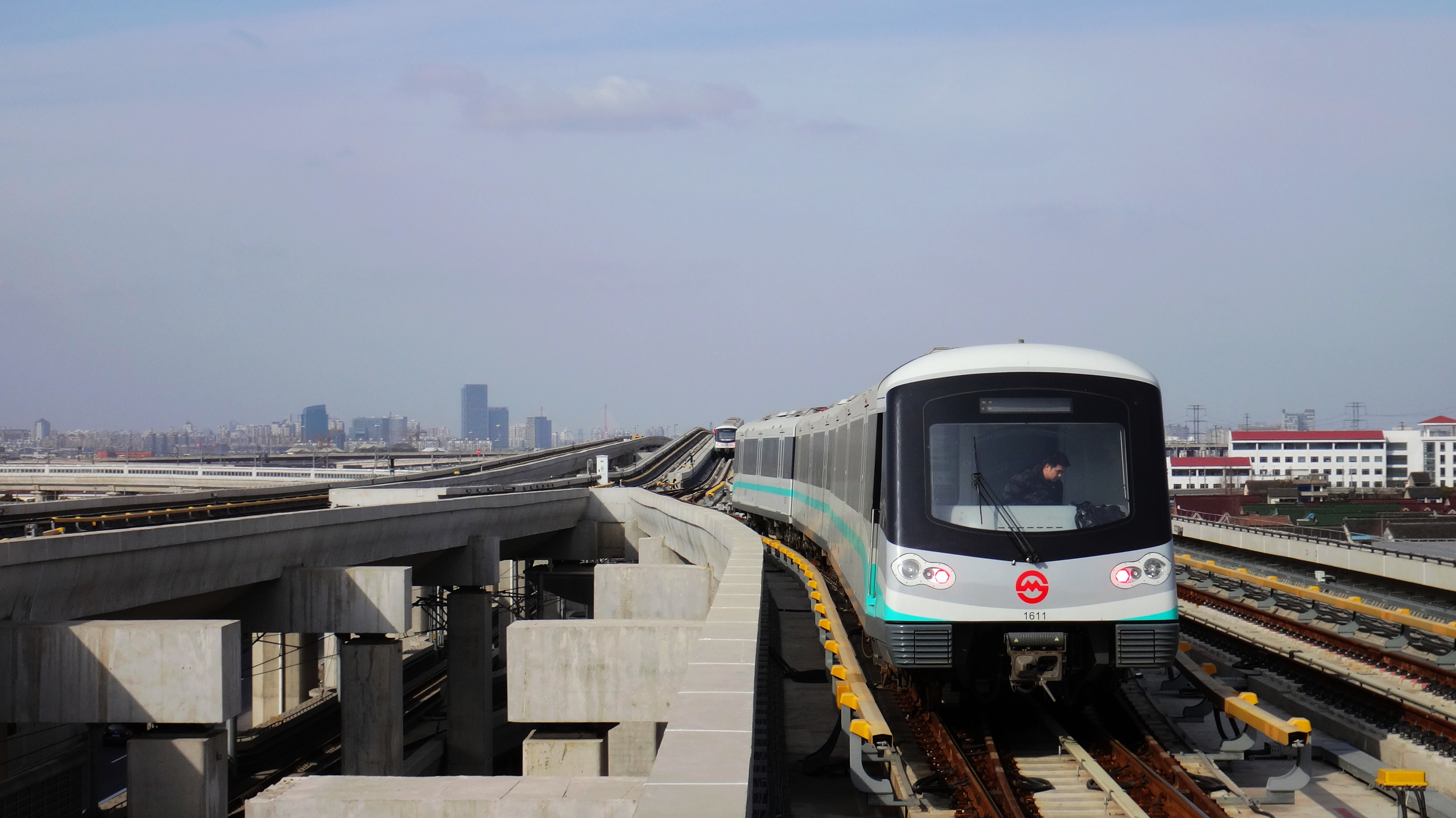
16A01 train

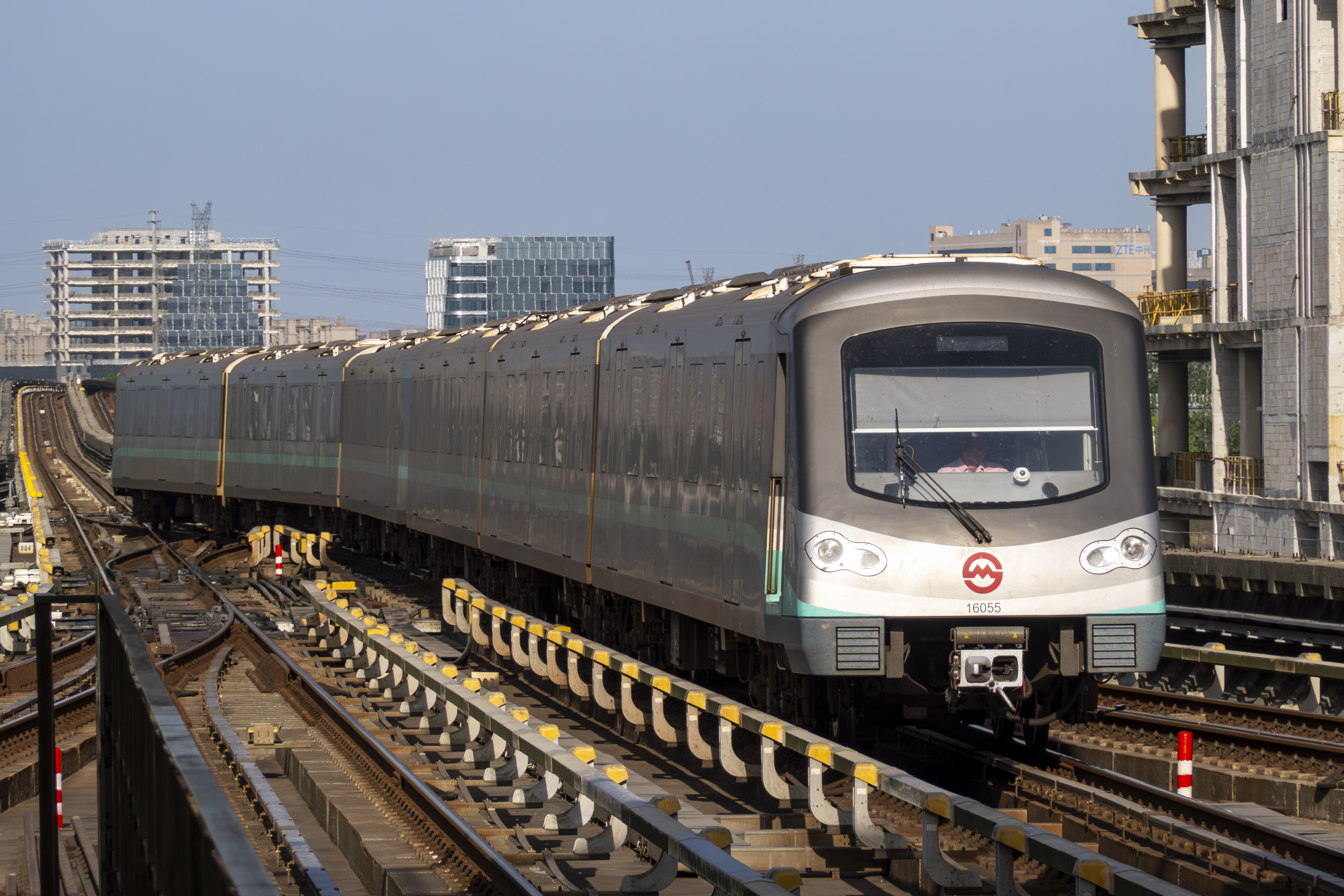
16A02 train
