= Luoshan Road station =

Shanghai Metro interchange station

Luoshan Road 罗山路
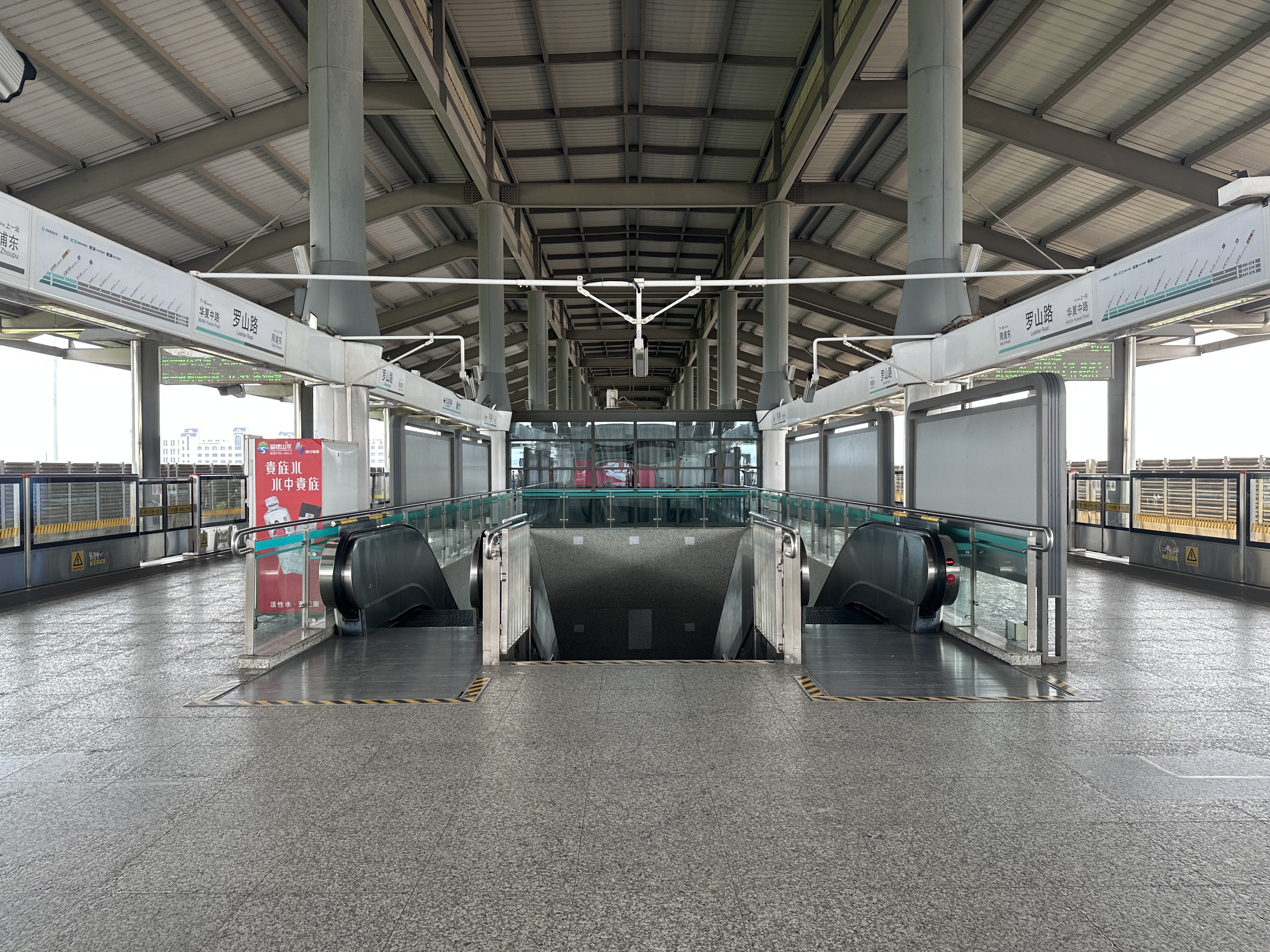
- Platform of Line 16

General information
- Location: Luoshan Road (罗山路); Pudong, Shanghai; China
- Coordinates: 31.1521°N 121.5937°E
- Operator: Shanghai No. 2 Metro Operation Co., Ltd. (Line 11); Shanghai Maglev Transportation Development Co., Ltd. (Line 16)
- Lines: Line 11; Line 16
- Platforms: 4 (2 island platforms)
- Tracks: 4

Construction
- Structure type: Elevated
- Accessible: Yes

History
- Opened: 31 August 2013 (Line 11); 29 December 2013 (Line 16)

Services
Preceding station	Shanghai Metro	Following station
Yuqiao towards North Jiading or Huaqiao	Line 11	Xiuyan Road towards Disney Resort
Middle Huaxia Road towards Longyang Road	Line 16	East Zhoupu towards Dishui Lake
Longyang Road Terminus	Line 16 Express service	Xinchang towards Dishui Lake
Location
- Location within Shanghai

Luoshan Road (simplified Chinese: 罗山路; traditional Chinese: 羅山路; pinyin: Luóshān Lù) is a Shanghai Metro interchange station which serves both Line 11 and Line 16. Line 11 opened on 31 August 2013, with the first section of Line 16 opening on 29 December 2013. It was formerly Line 16's northern terminus before its extension towards Longyang Road. It was also Line 11's eastern terminus before the extension to Kangxin Highway opened on 19 December 2015.

== Station layout ==
3F		← Line 16 towards Longyang Road (Middle Huaxia Road)
3F	Island platform, doors open on the left
3F		Line 16 towards Dishui Lake (East Zhoupu) →
2F		← Line 11 towards North Jiading or Huaqiao (Yuqiao)
2F	Island platform, doors open on the left
2F		Line 11 towards Disney Resort (Xiuyan Road) →
1F	Concourse	Exits, Tickets, Service Center

=== Entrances/exits ===
- 1
- 2: Luoshan Road
- 3: Luoshan Road
- 4: Luoshan Road
- 5
