= Longyang Road station =

Shanghai Metro interchange station

Longyang Road 龙阳路
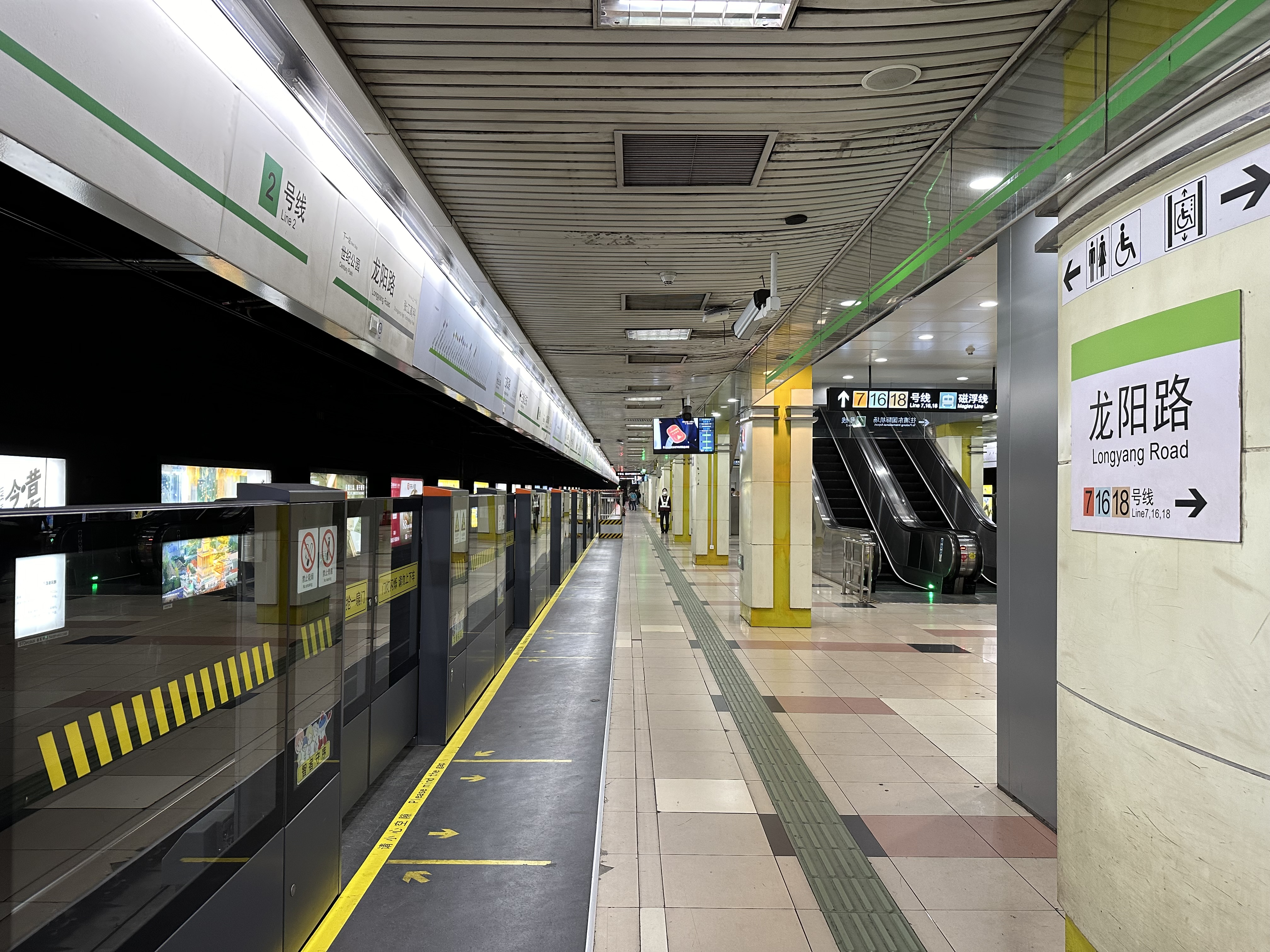
- Line 2 platform

General information
- Location: Longyang Road (龙阳路) and Baiyang Road (白杨路); Pudong, Shanghai; China
- Coordinates: 31°12′11″N 121°33′25″E
- Operator: Shanghai No. 2/3 Metro Operation Co. Ltd. Shanghai Maglev Transportation Development Co., Ltd.
- Lines: Line 2; Line 7; Line 16; Line 18; Shanghai maglev train
- Platforms: Metro: 10 (5 island platforms); Maglev: 4 (1 island and 2 side platforms)
- Tracks: Metro: 10; Maglev: 2

Construction
- Structure type: Underground (Lines 2, 7 & 18); Elevated (Line 16 & Maglev)
- Accessible: Yes

Other information
- Station code: L02/12(Line 2) L7/32(Line 7) L16/01(Line16)

History
- Opened: 20 September 1999 (Line 2); 31 December 2002 (Maglev); 5 December 2009 (Line 7); 28 December 2014 (Line 16); 30 December 2021 (Line 18)

Services
Preceding station	Shanghai Metro	Following station
Century Park towards Panxiang Road · Shanghai National Accounting Institute	Line 2	Zhangjiang Hi-Tech Park towards Pudong Airport Terminal 1&2
Fanghua Road towards Meilan Lake	Line 7	Huamu Road Terminus
Terminus	Line 16	Middle Huaxia Road towards Dishui Lake
Terminus	Line 16 Express service	Luoshan Road towards Dishui Lake
Terminus	Line 16 Direct service	Dishui Lake Terminus
Yingchun Road towards Kangwen Road	Line 18	Fangxin Road towards Hangtou
Terminus	Shanghai maglev train	Pudong Airport Terminal 1&2 Terminus
Location
- Location within Shanghai

Longyang Road (Chinese: 龙阳路; pinyin: Lóngyáng Lù) is an interchange station that serves both the Shanghai maglev train and lines 2, 7, 16 and 18 on the Shanghai Metro. It provides quick transfers between the metro system and the Maglev train to and from Pudong International Airport. There are two separate fare-paid zones at this station: one for the conventional metro lines (Lines 2, 7, 16, 18) and one for the Maglev train, which has a separate fare system. It is also the third four-line interchange station in mainland China and the second in Shanghai, after Century Avenue and Chegongmiao in Shenzhen, and the first five-line interchange (Maglev included) station in Shanghai and mainland China.

== History ==
On 20 September 1999, this station is part of the initial section of Line 2 that opened from Zhongshan Park to this station that opened. Trial operations on the Shanghai Maglev opened on the last day of 2002.

The interchanges with Lines 7 opened on 5 December 2009. The interchange with Line 16 opened on 28 December 2014. The interchange with Line 18 opened on 30 December 2021, with the formal opening of Line 18 north section, the station becomes a five-line transfer station.

== Structure ==
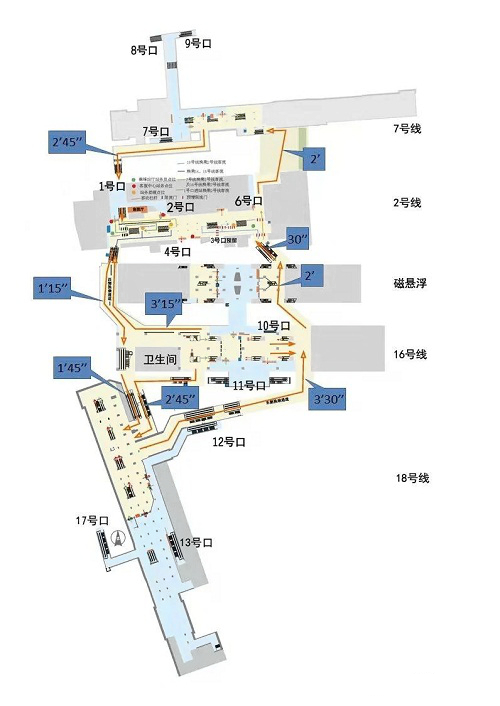
The layouts of transfer routes in Chinese

Longyang Road station consists of five parts, from north to the south respectively, Line 7, Line 2, Maglev Line, Line 16 and Line 18. Lines 2, 7 and 18 are under ground, while the station hall of Line 2 is on the ground level. The station on Line 16 and Maglev Line are elevated stations.

The platform of Lines 2, 7, 18 are standard island platforms. There are 2 sets of island platforms at Line 16, while trains provide service usually on platforms 1, 2 and 3. The platform 2 is usually used for express trains (stops only at Luoshan Road station, Xinchang station, Huinan station, Lingang Avenue station and Dishui Lake station) and non-stop trains (directly heads for Dishui Lake). The train coupling and decoupling take place on weekdays at platform 1.

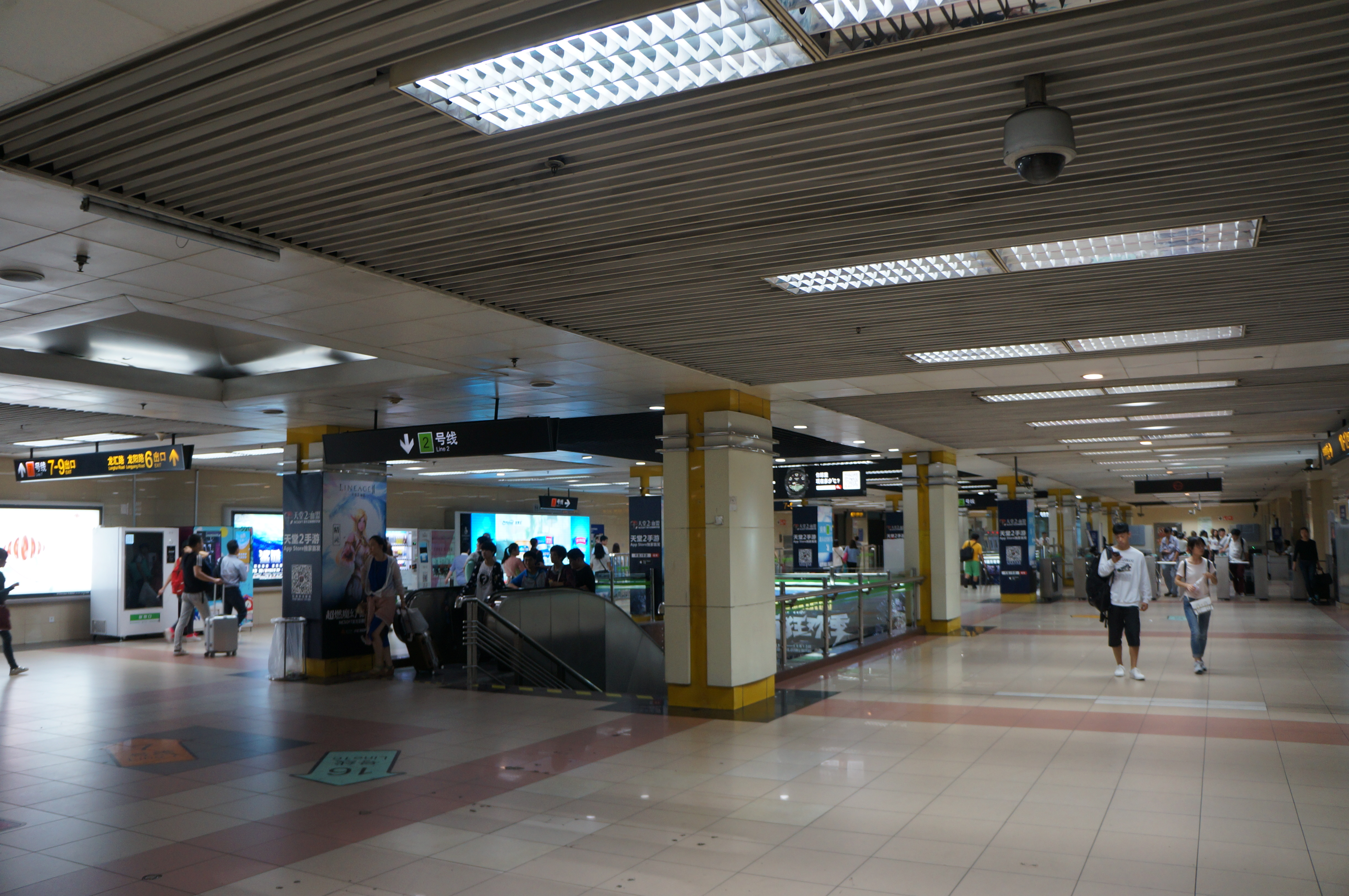
Concourse for L2

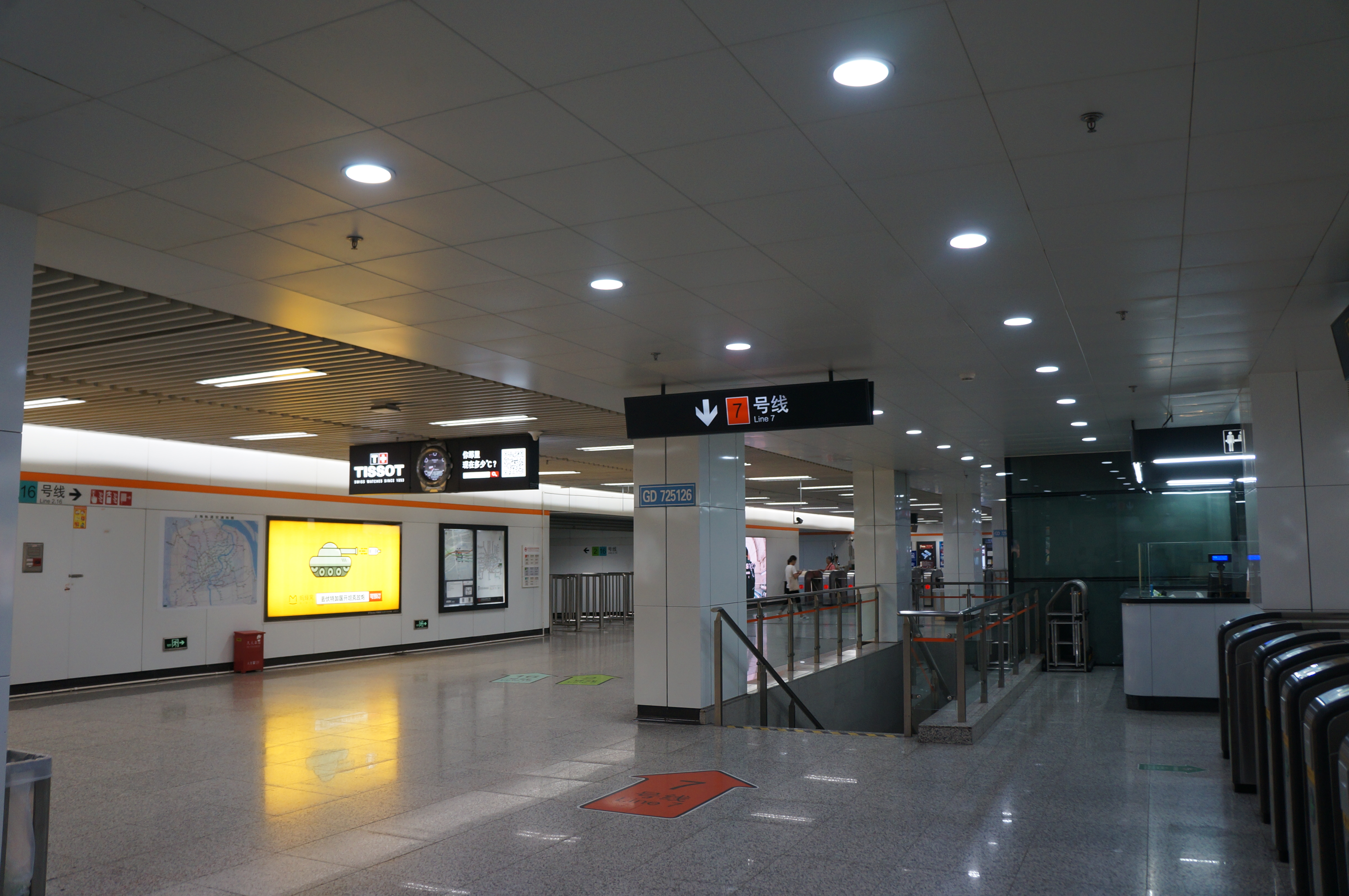
Concourse for L7

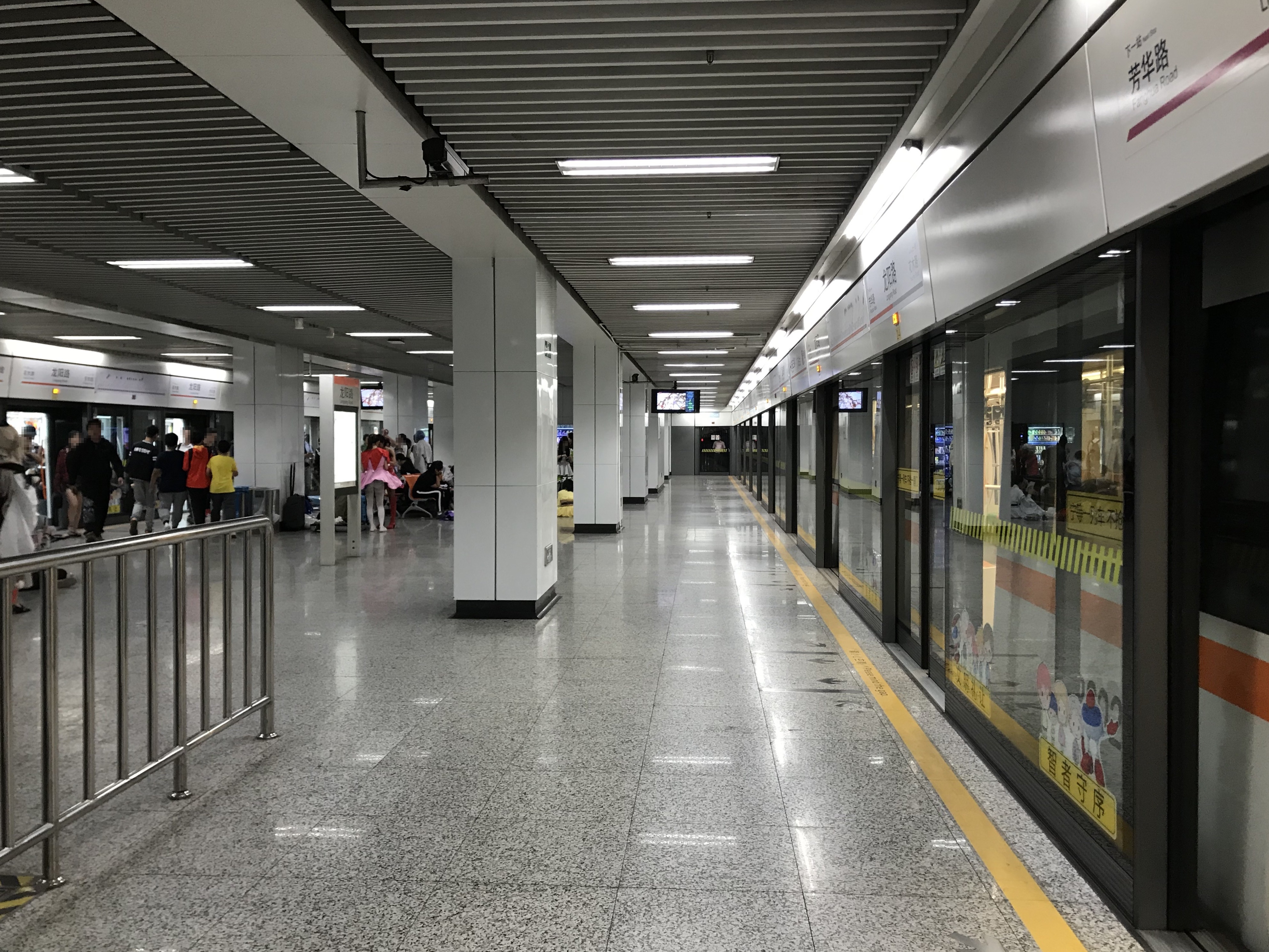
Line 7 platform

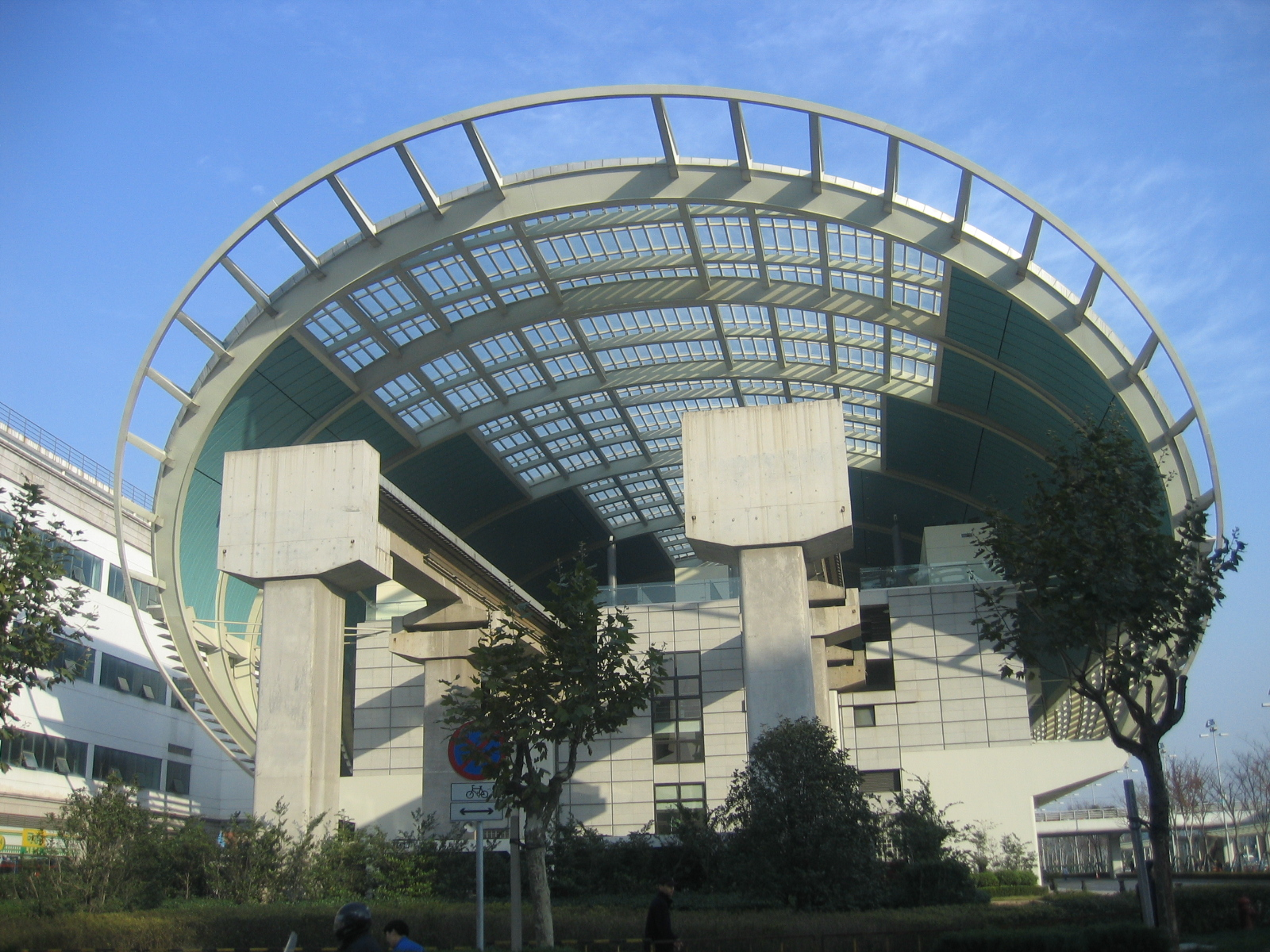
Exterior of Maglev station

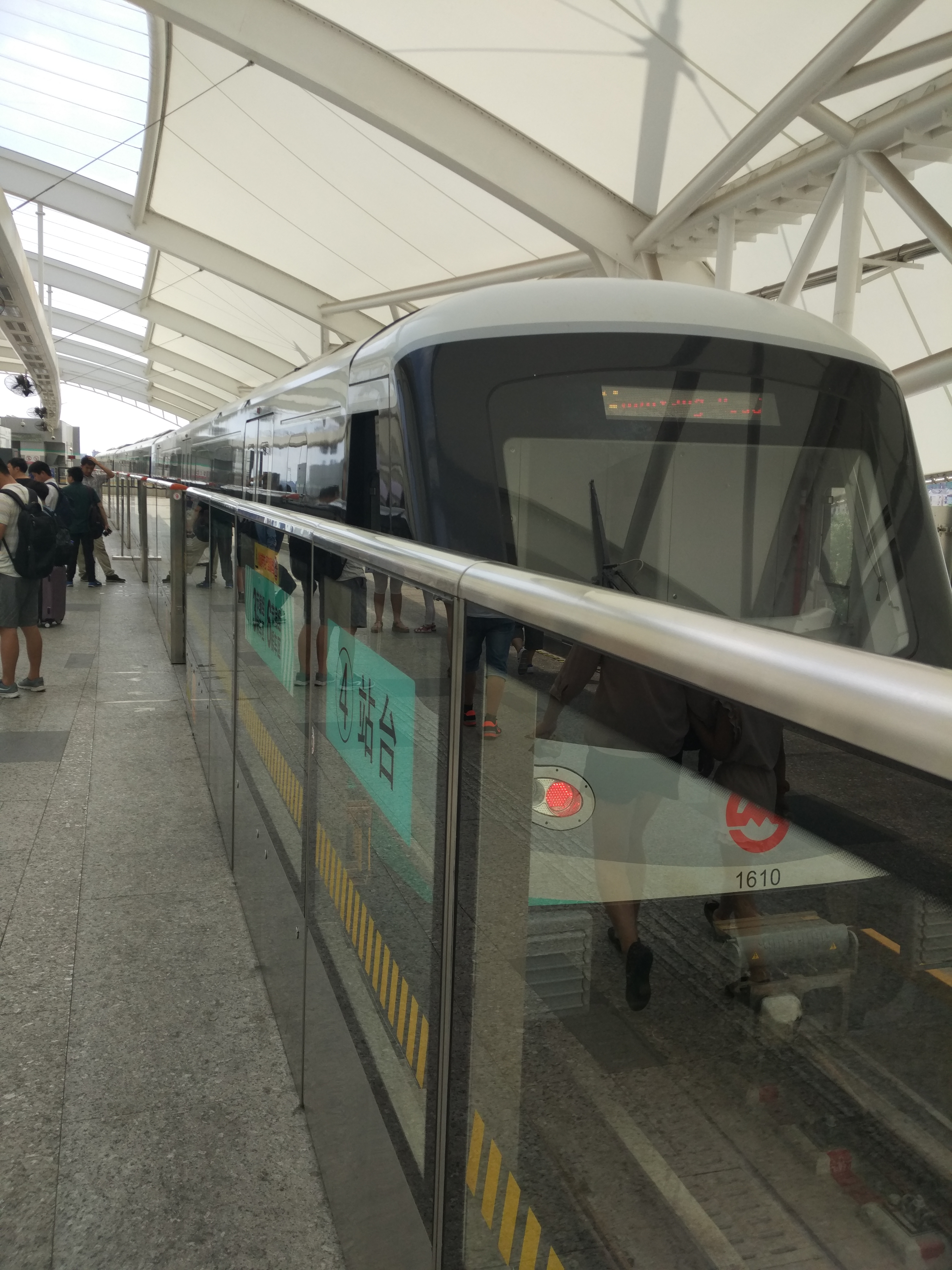
Line 16 platform

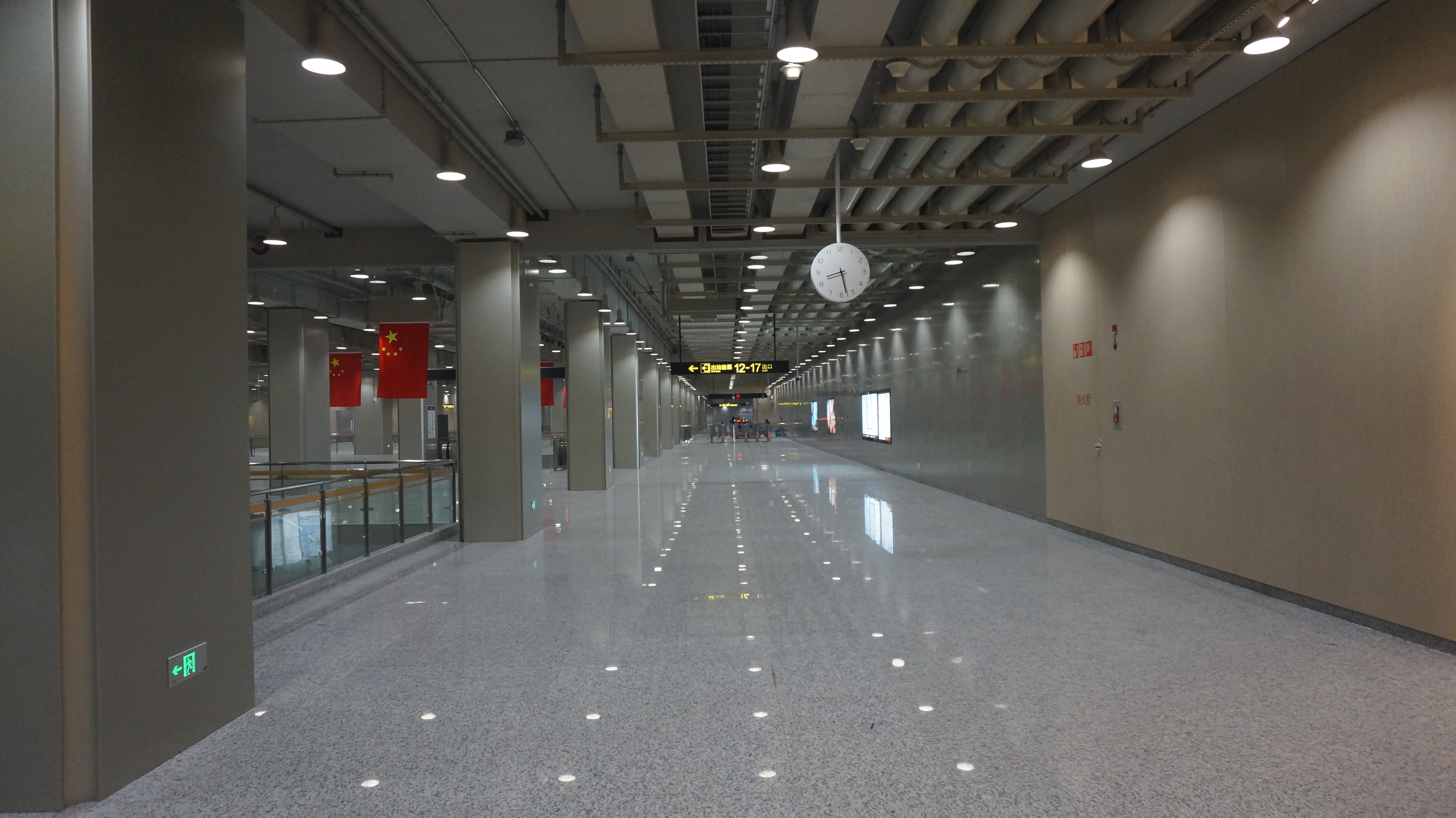
Station hall of Line 18

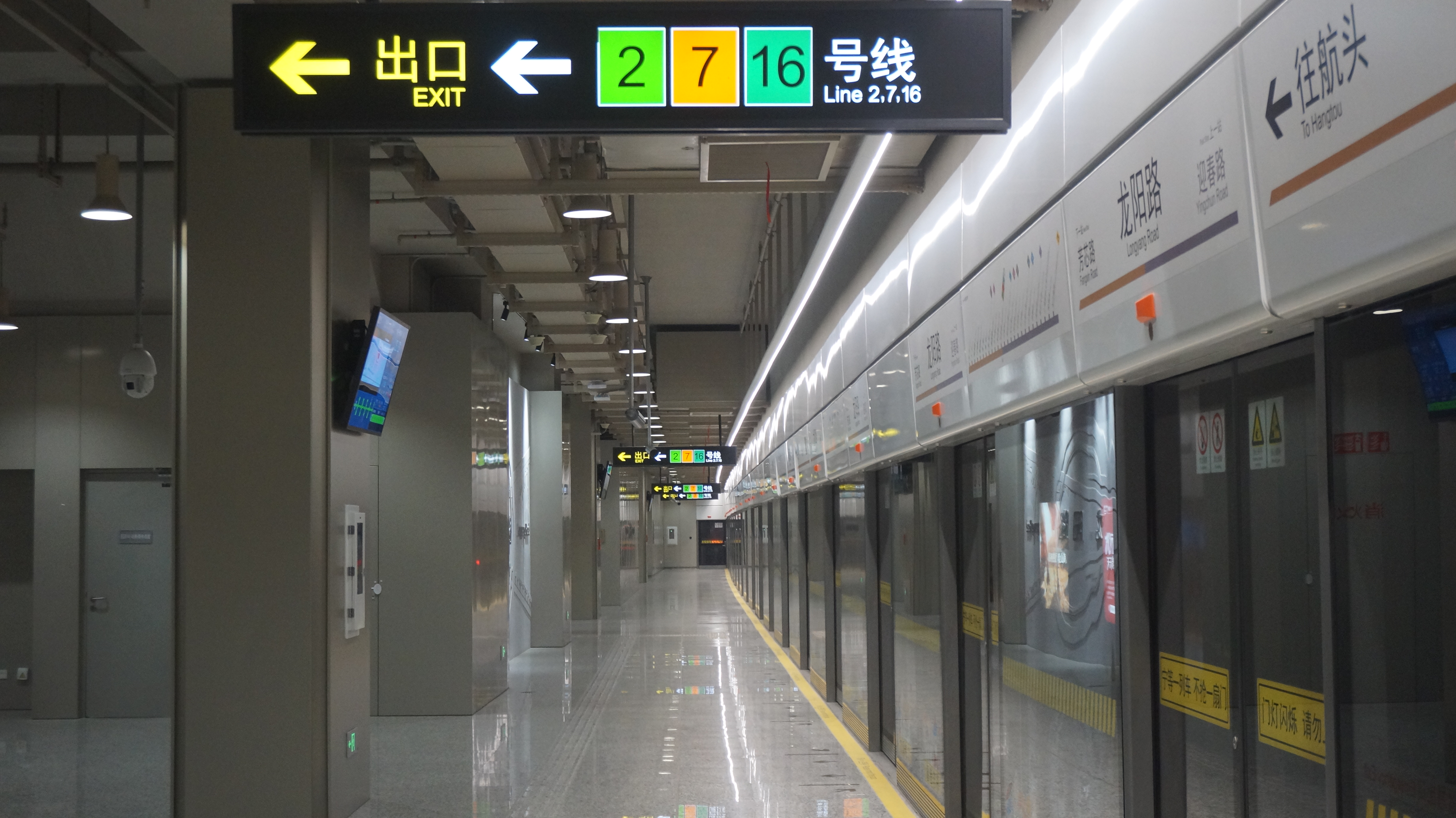
The platform of Line 18

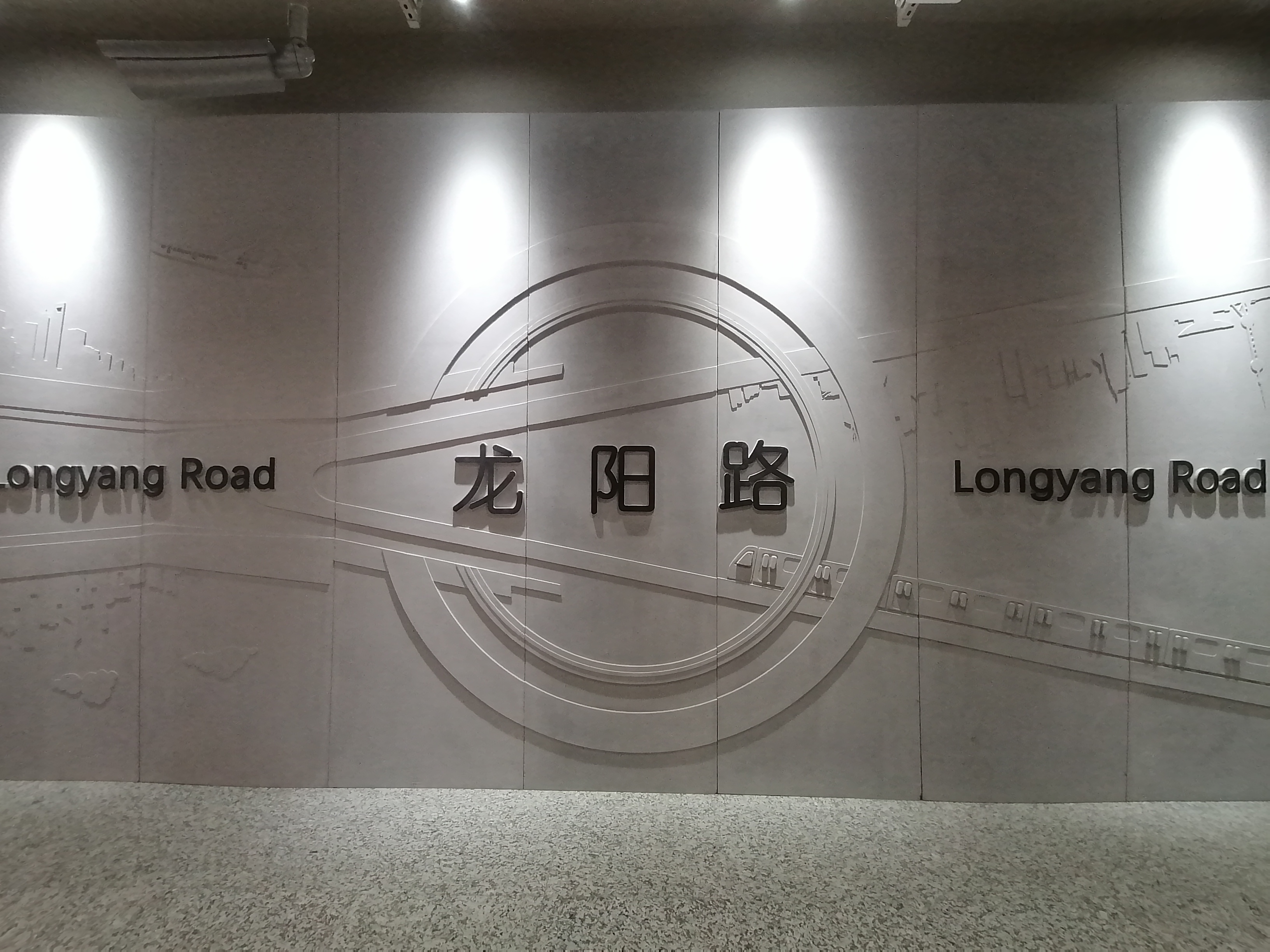
Station name wall at the Line 18 platform

=== Transfer ===
Since the opening of the north section of Line 18, Longyang Road has become a five-line transfer station. Between the part of Line 7, Line 2, Line 16 and Line 18, there are two mono-directional transfer passages. For example, passengers at Line 7 can go through a transfer passage and arrive at the station hall of Line 2, which takes about 3 minutes. Then across the station hall of Line 2, passengers walks above one minute to arrive at the west end of Line 16 station hall. Passengers can either turn left to transfer to Line 16, which takes 3.5 minutes, or walk straight to transfer to Line 18, which takes about 1 minute and 45 seconds.

Passengers at the Line 18 station hall at the south end of the whole station can walk to the station hall of Line 16 through a transfer passage at the east, which takes about 3.5 minutes. Then passengers can arrive at the station hall of Line 2 through the station hall of Maglev Line and a set of mono-directional escalator, which takes about 2.5 minutes. Following through the transfer passage, passengers at the Line 2 station hall will walk to the east end of Line 7 station hall, which takes about 2min.

To take the Shanghai maglev train, the nearest exit is Exit 4 at Line 2.

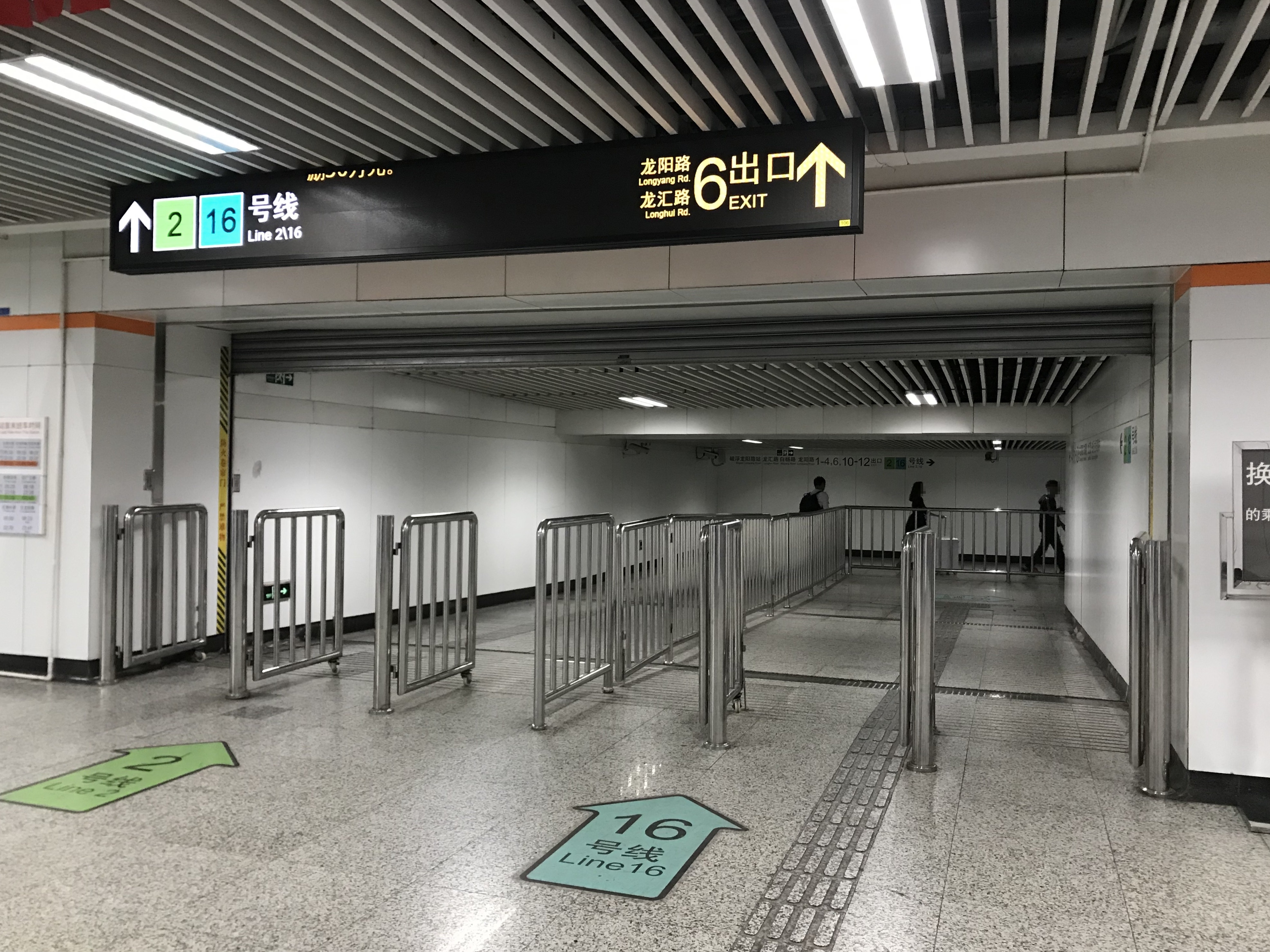
Transfer passage between the two station halls of Line 2 & Line 7

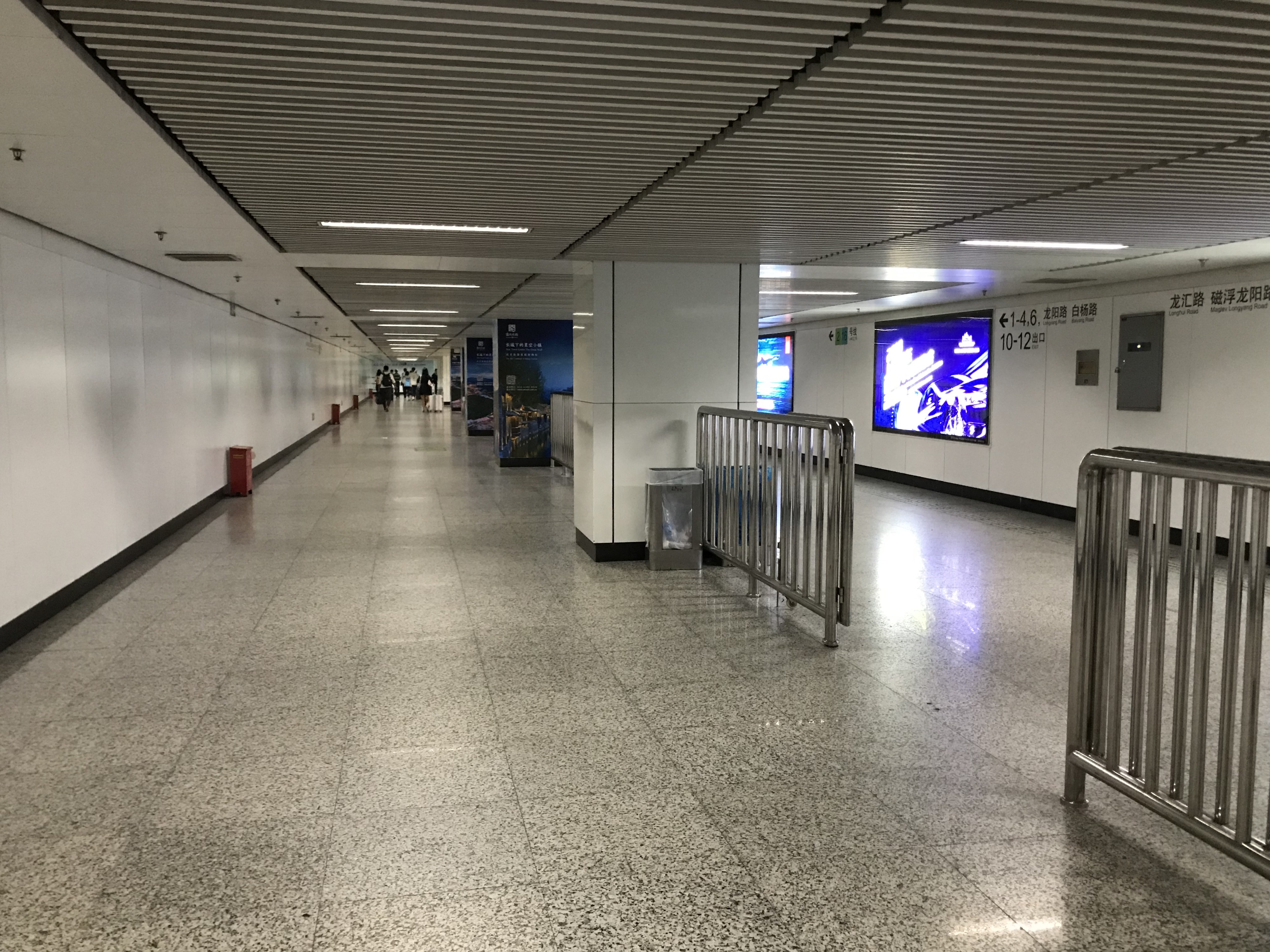
Transfer passage between the two station halls of Line 2 & Line 7

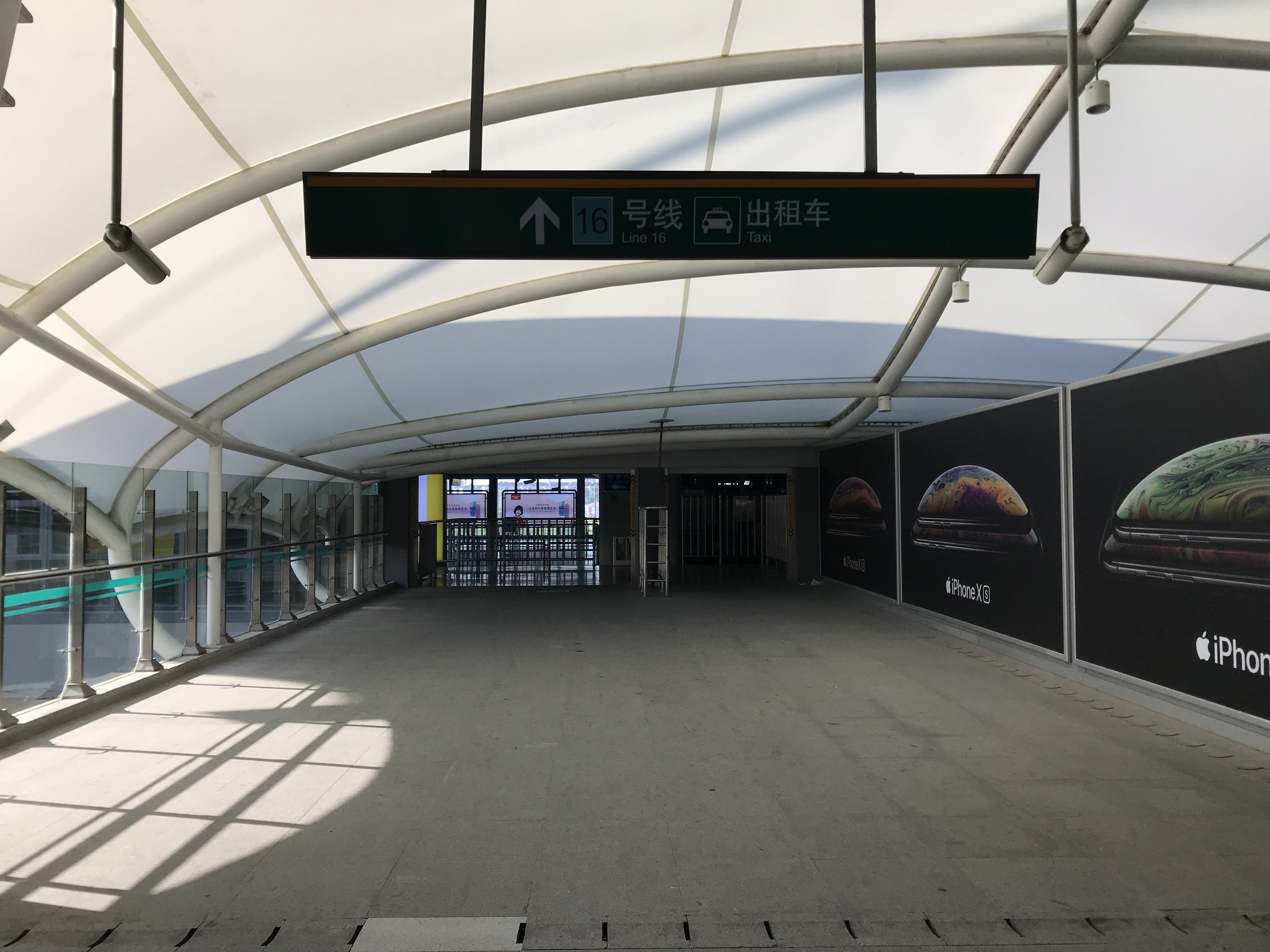
Transfer passage between the two station halls of Line 2 & Line 16

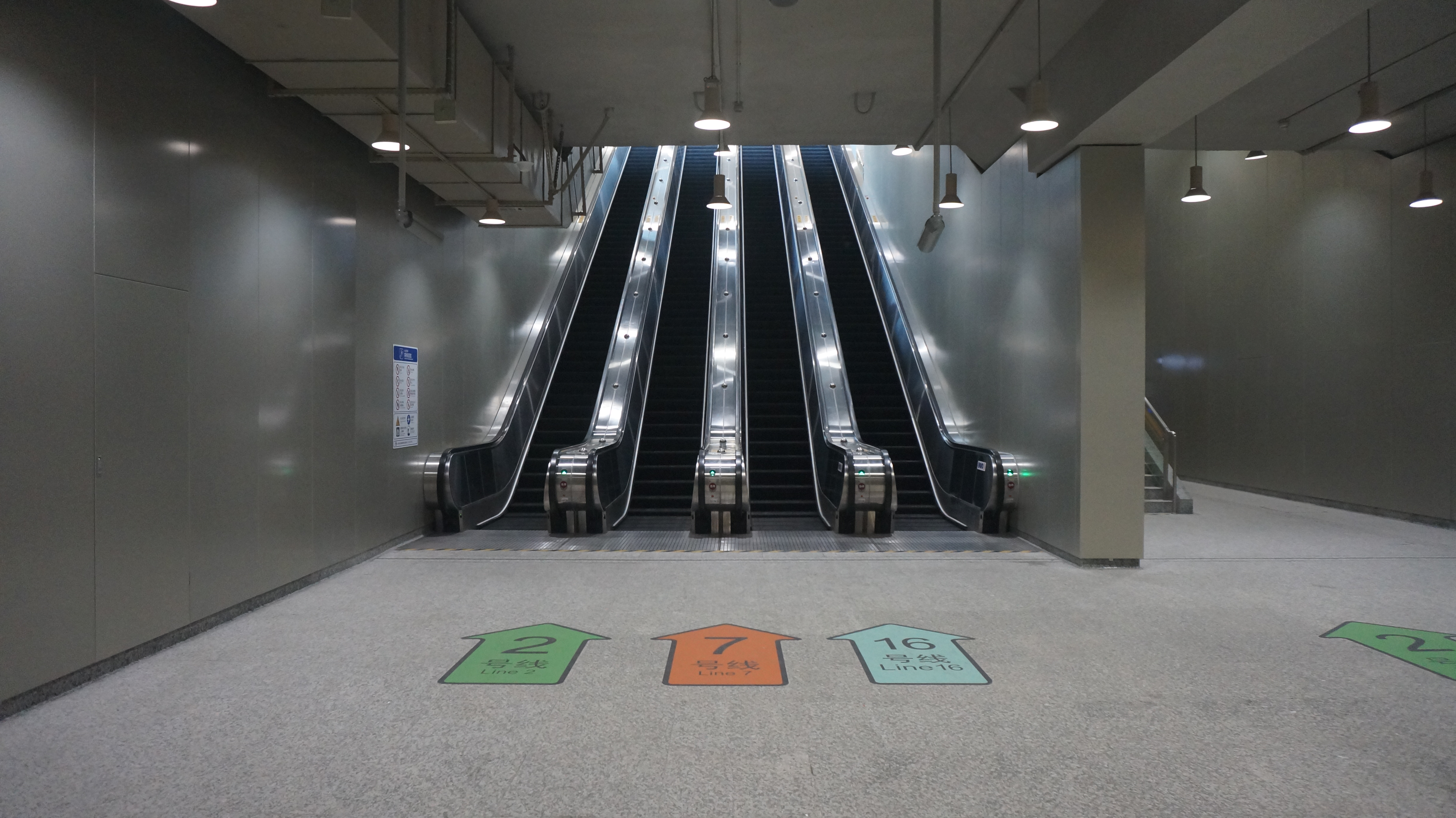
A set of escalators mono-directionally upwards, at the transfer passage from Line 18 to Line 16

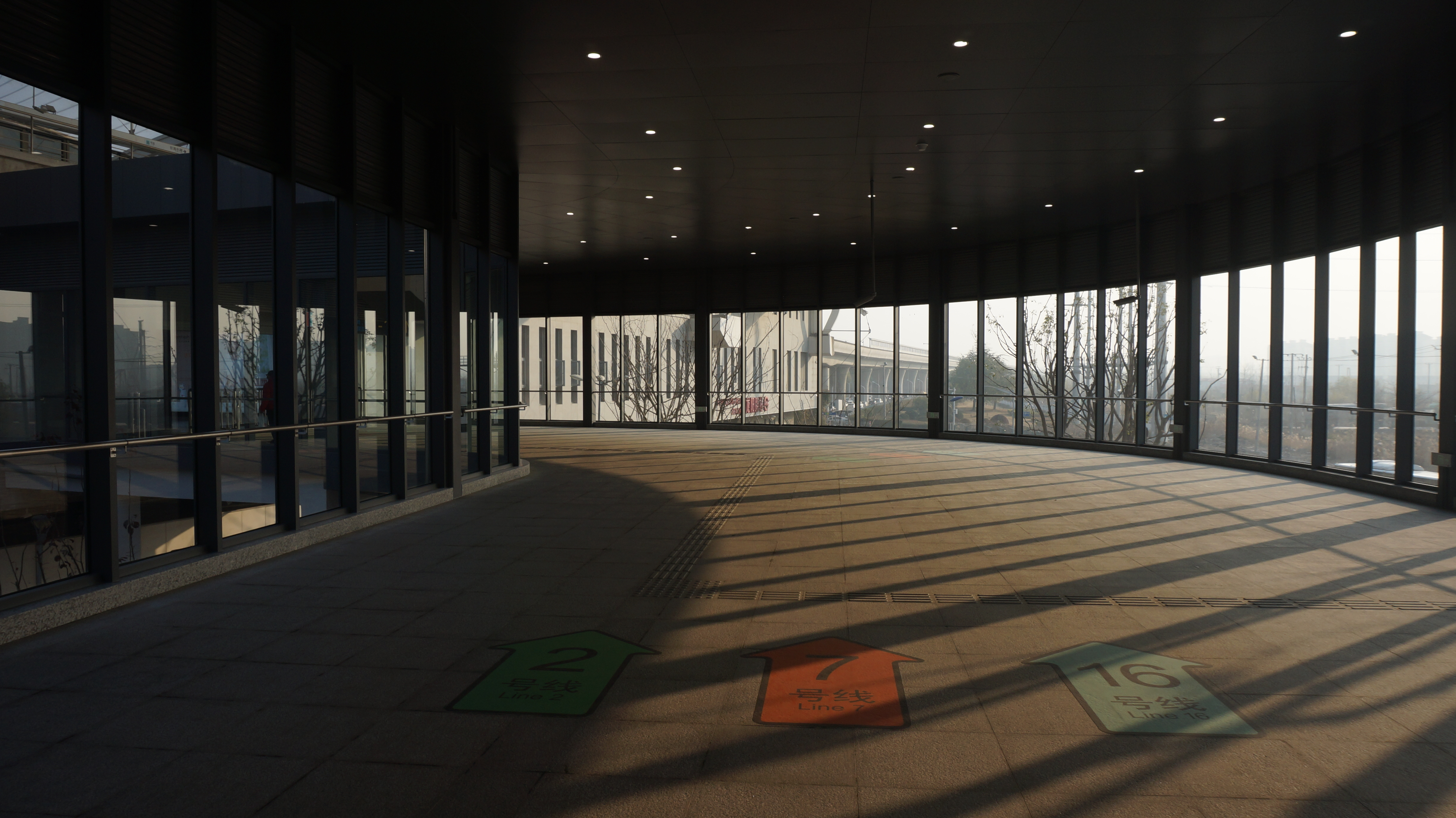
Transfer passage from Line 18 to Line 16 at the elevated part

== Incidents ==
At 11:05 on 26 April 2021, a passenger climbed the passenger edge doors, in an attempt to enter the tunnel of Line 2. Station staff quickly reacted; however, staff later confirmed the passenger that climbed the door had died. Services continued from noon that day.

== Places nearby ==
- Huamu Park
- Longyang Plaza
- Shanghai New International Expo Center
- Wan Bang City Garden
