= Dishui Lake station =

Shanghai Metro station

Dishui Lake 滴水湖
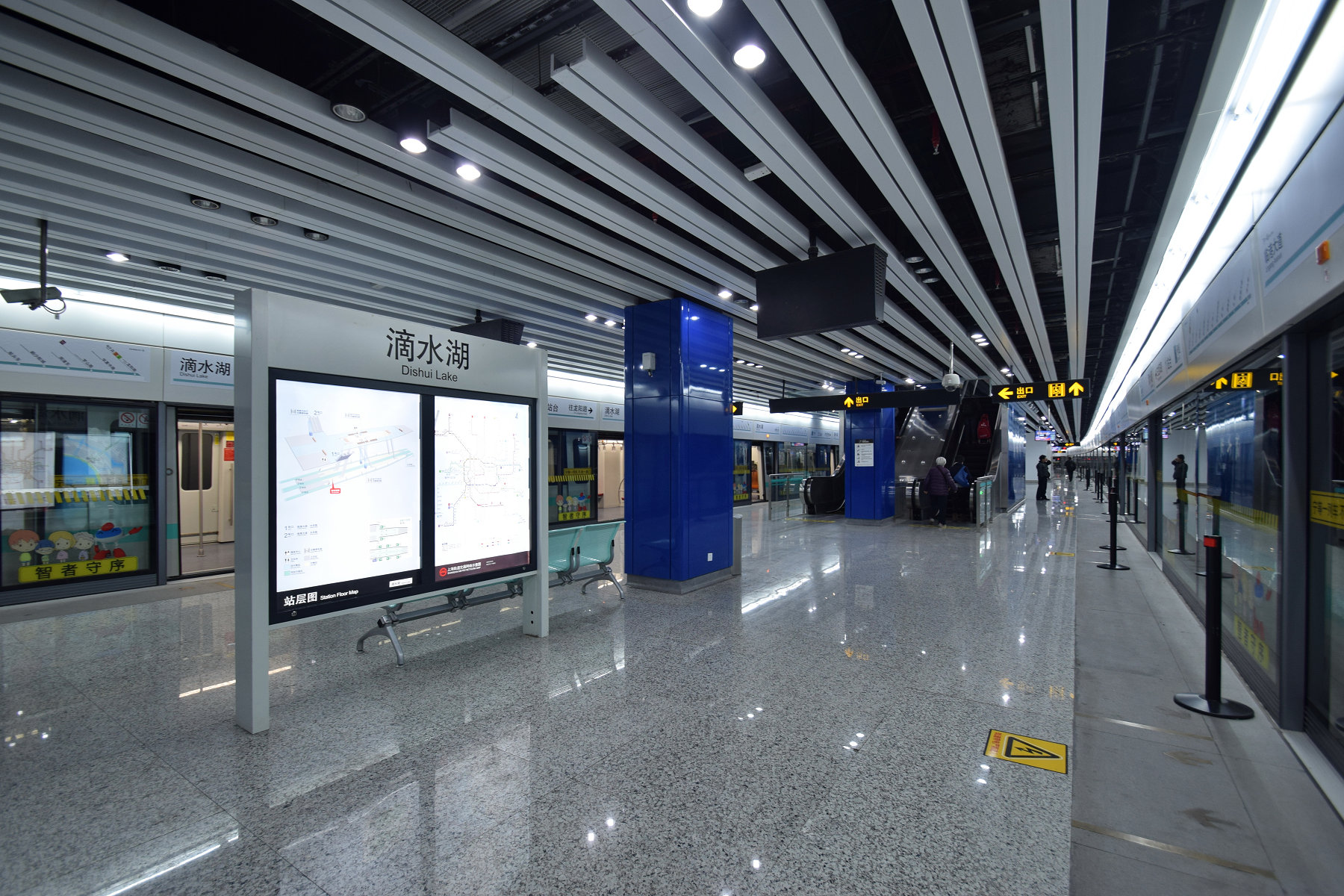
- Station platform

General information
- Location: Lingang Avenue (临港大道) and Shuiyun Road (水芸路); Pudong, Shanghai; China
- Coordinates: 30.90943°N 121.92564°E
- Line: Line 16
- Platforms: 4 (2 island platforms)
- Tracks: 4

Construction
- Structure type: Underground
- Accessible: Yes

History
- Opened: 29 December 2013

Services
Preceding station	Shanghai Metro	Following station
Lingang Avenue towards Longyang Road	Line 16 Local and express services	Terminus
Longyang Road Terminus	Line 16 Direct service	Terminus
Location
- Location within Shanghai

Dishui Lake (Chinese: 滴水湖; pinyin: Dīshuǐ Hú) is the southern terminal station on Line 16 of the Shanghai Metro, located at Lingang Avenue (临港大道) between Shuiyun Road (水芸路) and Yunjuan Road (云鹃路) in the far southeast of Pudong New Area. It serves the artificial Dishui Lake and Shanghai Maritime University, both within a short distance of the station. It is currently the southernmost and easternmost station on the Shanghai Metro, and opened on 29 December 2013 as part of the first section of Line 16 from Luoshan Road to Dishui Lake.

== Places nearby ==
- Dishui Lake. The largest artificial lake in China.
- China Maritime Museum located at 197 Shengang Avenue. The museum is a 20 minute walk, or a quick taxi ride.
- Shanghai Astronomy Museum located at 380 Lingang Avenue. Opened 18 July 2021 it is 38,000 square meters, and able to host 6,000 visitors a day, it is believed to be the largest of its kind in the world.

== Services ==
It is served by local, express and direct services to Longyang Road on Line 16. For the local and express services, the preceding station is Lingang Avenue station. Direct trains run non-stop all the way to Longyang Road station.
