= Nanhui New City =

Planned city in Shanghai, China

Nanhui New City 南汇新城 Nanhwei
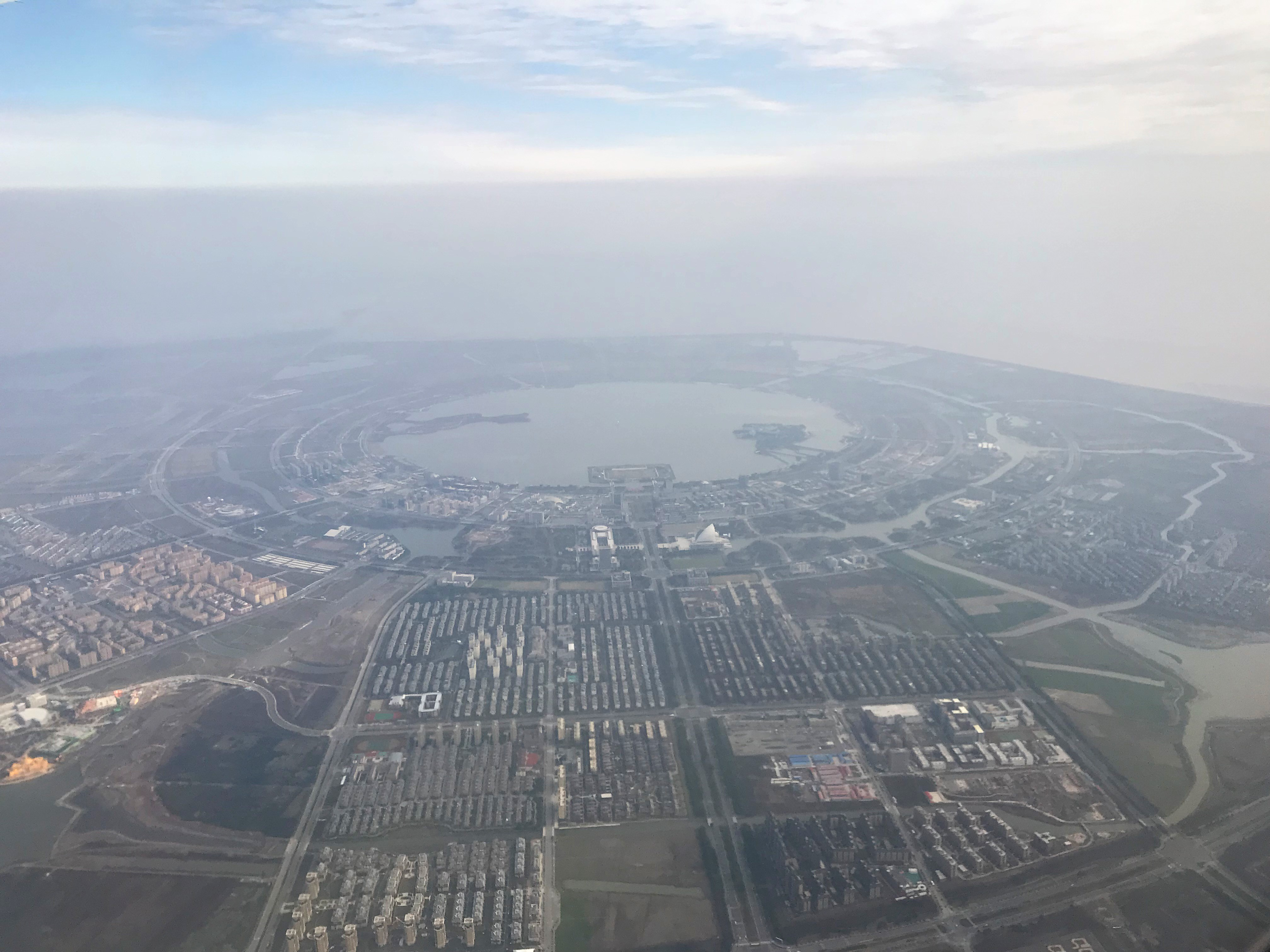
- Dishui Lake from Above

- Location of Nanhui New City in Shanghai Nanhui New City (China)
- Coordinates: 30°54′00″N 121°56′12″E
- Country: China
- Municipality: Shanghai
- District: Pudong
- Established: 2003

Area
  - Total: 343.32 km^{2} (132.56 sq mi)

Population
  - Total: 479,900
  - Density: 1,398/km^{2} (3,620/sq mi)
- Time zone: UTC+8 (China Standard Time (CST))

Nanhui New City (simplified Chinese: 南汇新城; traditional Chinese: 南匯新城) is a planned city located in the southeasternmost tip of Pudong New Area in Shanghai, China. It was formerly called Lingang New City (simplified Chinese: 临港新城; traditional Chinese: 臨港新城, It means "new city near the port") until it was renamed in April 2012.

Construction began in 2003 and is scheduled to be completed in 2020, with the German architecture company Gerkan, Marg and Partners leading the project. The project is estimated to have cost $4.5 billion. The city is aimed to house 450,000 to 800,000 residents while attracting 10 million annual tourists.

== Climate ==
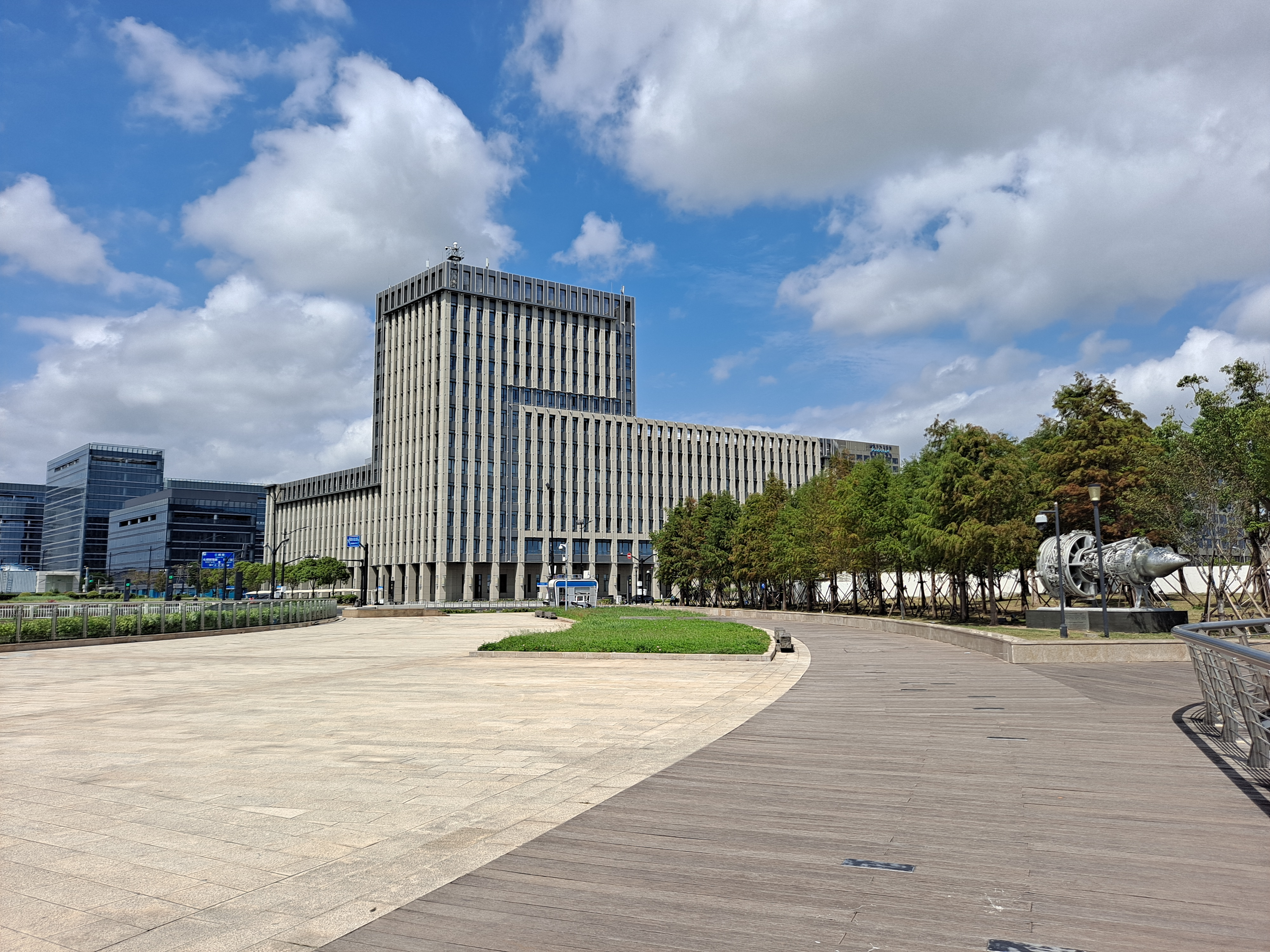

Nanhui New City has a humid subtropical climate (Köppen: Cfa), with an average annual temperature of 17.1 °C (62.8 °F). The highest temperature record since 1951 was 40.1 °C (104 °F) on 8 August 2013.

Climate data for Xiaoyangshan Island, elevation 54 m (177 ft), (1991–2020 normals)
Month	Jan	Feb	Mar	Apr	May	Jun	Jul	Aug	Sep	Oct	Nov	Dec	Year
Mean daily maximum °C (°F)	8.0 (46.4)	9.4 (48.9)	13.2 (55.8)	17.8 (64.0)	22.8 (73.0)	25.6 (78.1)	30.6 (87.1)	31.0 (87.8)	27.0 (80.6)	22.6 (72.7)	17.5 (63.5)	11.1 (52.0)	19.7 (67.5)
Daily mean °C (°F)	5.9 (42.6)	6.9 (44.4)	10.2 (50.4)	14.7 (58.5)	19.8 (67.6)	23.1 (73.6)	27.6 (81.7)	28.2 (82.8)	24.7 (76.5)	20.5 (68.9)	15.3 (59.5)	8.8 (47.8)	17.1 (62.9)
Mean daily minimum °C (°F)	4.2 (39.6)	4.9 (40.8)	8.0 (46.4)	12.4 (54.3)	17.6 (63.7)	21.3 (70.3)	25.5 (77.9)	26.2 (79.2)	23.0 (73.4)	18.9 (66.0)	13.6 (56.5)	7.0 (44.6)	15.2 (59.4)
Average precipitation mm (inches)	64.1 (2.52)	77.2 (3.04)	104.1 (4.10)	90.8 (3.57)	95.5 (3.76)	251.0 (9.88)	106.6 (4.20)	118.2 (4.65)	129.5 (5.10)	95.8 (3.77)	69.7 (2.74)	60.5 (2.38)	1,263 (49.71)
Average precipitation days (≥ 0.1 mm)	11.1	11.3	13.0	10.5	11.0	15.3	9.5	9.1	10.5	6.3	10.3	9.2	127.1
Average snowy days	2.1	1.5	0.3	0.1	0	0	0	0	0	0	0	1.0	5
Average relative humidity (%)	74	77	76	77	79	87	82	81	78	71	72	70	77
Mean monthly sunshine hours	114.4	110.7	152.7	174.4	183.3	122.5	230.6	247.2	174.8	172.0	131.7	141.4	1,955.7
Percentage possible sunshine	36	35	41	45	43	29	54	61	48	49	42	45	44
Source: China Meteorological Administration

Climate data for Huinan Town, elevation 5 m (16 ft), (1991–2020 normals, extremes 1981–2013)
Month	Jan	Feb	Mar	Apr	May	Jun	Jul	Aug	Sep	Oct	Nov	Dec	Year
Record high °C (°F)	22.1 (71.8)	25.6 (78.1)	27.4 (81.3)	31.7 (89.1)	34.3 (93.7)	35.5 (95.9)	39.0 (102.2)	40.1 (104.2)	36.6 (97.9)	32.2 (90.0)	27.6 (81.7)	23.5 (74.3)	40.1 (104.2)
Mean daily maximum °C (°F)	8.6 (47.5)	10.2 (50.4)	13.9 (57.0)	19.3 (66.7)	24.2 (75.6)	27.1 (80.8)	31.6 (88.9)	31.3 (88.3)	27.6 (81.7)	23.0 (73.4)	17.8 (64.0)	11.5 (52.7)	20.5 (68.9)
Daily mean °C (°F)	4.8 (40.6)	6.2 (43.2)	9.8 (49.6)	14.9 (58.8)	20.0 (68.0)	23.7 (74.7)	28.0 (82.4)	27.9 (82.2)	24.2 (75.6)	19.1 (66.4)	13.6 (56.5)	7.3 (45.1)	16.6 (61.9)
Mean daily minimum °C (°F)	1.8 (35.2)	3.0 (37.4)	6.4 (43.5)	11.2 (52.2)	16.5 (61.7)	21.0 (69.8)	25.3 (77.5)	25.4 (77.7)	21.4 (70.5)	15.7 (60.3)	10.1 (50.2)	4.0 (39.2)	13.5 (56.3)
Record low °C (°F)	−7.9 (17.8)	−6.0 (21.2)	−4.2 (24.4)	−0.7 (30.7)	7.1 (44.8)	12.7 (54.9)	18.7 (65.7)	18.8 (65.8)	11.5 (52.7)	1.9 (35.4)	−1.7 (28.9)	−7.8 (18.0)	−7.9 (17.8)
Average precipitation mm (inches)	72.2 (2.84)	67.9 (2.67)	97.5 (3.84)	85.2 (3.35)	94.0 (3.70)	211.2 (8.31)	135.7 (5.34)	187.8 (7.39)	126.0 (4.96)	73.8 (2.91)	63.7 (2.51)	54.6 (2.15)	1,269.6 (49.97)
Average precipitation days (≥ 0.1 mm)	10.9	10.1	13.4	12.0	11.8	15.0	11.6	11.9	10.2	7.8	9.4	8.8	132.9
Average snowy days	1.8	1.5	0.5	0	0	0	0	0	0	0	0	0.8	4.6
Average relative humidity (%)	77	78	78	77	78	85	82	83	81	78	78	75	79
Mean monthly sunshine hours	112.4	117.0	140.7	164.3	172.6	123.8	207.4	202.1	170.4	164.3	131.9	130.1	1,837
Percentage possible sunshine	35	37	38	42	41	29	48	50	46	47	42	42	41
Source: China Meteorological Administration

== Location ==
The site is located at the tip of the peninsula between the Yangtze and the Qiantang rivers on Hangzhou Bay. It is approximately 60 kilometers southeast of downtown Shanghai. A major portion of the site was reclaimed from the sea.

The city was slated to become a "mini-Hong Kong". However, despite real estate developments being sold quickly, people have been reluctant to move in. To help revitalize the city, eight university campuses have been built on the west side of Nanhui New City, bringing in more than 100,000 students. In August 2019, it was announced that the area will be included in the Shanghai Free-Trade Zone.

Southeast of Shanghai is an area of major land change where this planned city is being built. Nanhui New City covers about 74 square kilometers and is intended to provide space for 800,000 people. It was formerly called Lingang New City and was renamed in April 2012.

The main feature of the new city is a circular artificial lake, visible in this series of images starting in 2004. Dishui Lake is 2.5 kilometers across and includes three artificial islands. The concentric structure of the city resembles a compass rose. The streets radiate out from the center. Waterways extend all over the city to support its theme of "waterside living."

Off the coast is Yangshan Deep-Water Port, one of the largest shipping ports in the world. The huge port opened in 2005 and can handle the world's largest container vessels. More than half of Yangshan Port was built on reclaimed land.

The port connects to Nanhui New City by the Donghai Bridge. Construction of the bridge is visible in the 2004 image. It opened to general traffic in 2005. The 32.5-kilometer-long bridge carries six lanes of traffic and is one of the longest bridges in the world.

== Attractions ==
- Shanghai Haichang Ocean Park
- Wintastar indoor ski resort
- Shanghai Planetarium
- China Maritime Museum, Shanghai

== See also ==
- Nanhui District
