= Xinchang (disambiguation) =

Xinchang may refer to:

- Xinchang County (新昌县), a county of Zhejiang province, China.
- Xinchang River (新昌江), a tributary of Cao'e River in Zhejiang province.
- Xinchang station (新场站), a station on Shanghai Metro Line 16.
- Xinchang, Jingzhou County (新厂镇), a town of Jingzhou Miao and Dong Autonomous County, Hunan Province.
- Xinchang Town (新场镇), a town of Fenghuang County, Hunan province.
