= Dafo =

Dafo may refer to: 43°19′19.20000″N 128°14′34.80000″E

- Edith Woodford-Grimes (1887–1975), English Wiccan
- DAFO (Dynamic Ankle Foot Orthosis), a brand name for some lower extremity braces that provide thin, flexible, external support to the foot, ankle and/or lower leg
- Leshan Giant Buddha, or Leshan Dafo, in Sichuan, China

== See also ==
- Dafo Temple (disambiguation), several temples in China
