= Xiaoshun River =

River in Zhejiang, China

The Xiaoshun or Little Shun River (Chinese: 小舜江; pinyin: Xiǎoshùn Jiāng), in Zhejiang Province of East China, is one of the main tributaries of the Cao'e River (formerly Shun River). It was formerly called Little River (小江) or East Little River (东小江). It is 73 kilometres (45 mi) long and has a basin area of 544 square kilometres (210 sq mi). The river has two sources: the South Creek (南溪) originates from Chitenggang (赤藤冈) in Zhuxi (竹溪), Shengzhou; and the North Creek originates in Jidong (稽东), Shaoxing County. The two streams join in Liangxi Township (两溪乡) to become Xiaoshun River, which then flows through Shangyu and joins the Cao'e River in Shangpu (上浦).
