= Huangze River =

River in Zhejiang, China

The Huangze River (Chinese: 黄泽江; pinyin: Huángzé Jiāng), in Zhejiang Province of East China, is one of the main tributaries of Cao'e River. It was formerly called Wangze Creek (王泽溪). The river is 70.6 kilometres (43.9 mi) long and has a basin area of 577 square kilometres (223 sq mi). It originates from Xiabo Peak (虾脖尖, elevation 954 meters) at the border of Ninghai and Xinchang counties. Its upper stretch is known as Jugen Creek (莒根溪), then as Guang Creek (广溪) and Heng Creek (横溪), and it becomes known as Huangze River after Changshan Village. It joins the Cao'e River in Shengzhou.
