= Dafo Temple =

Dafo Temple may refer to:

- Dafo Temple (Guangzhou), in Guangdong, China
- Dafo Temple (Xinchang), in Zhejiang, China
- Dafo Temple (Zhangye), in Gansu, China
