= Cao'e River =

Cao'e River Shun River, Shangyu River, Shan Stream
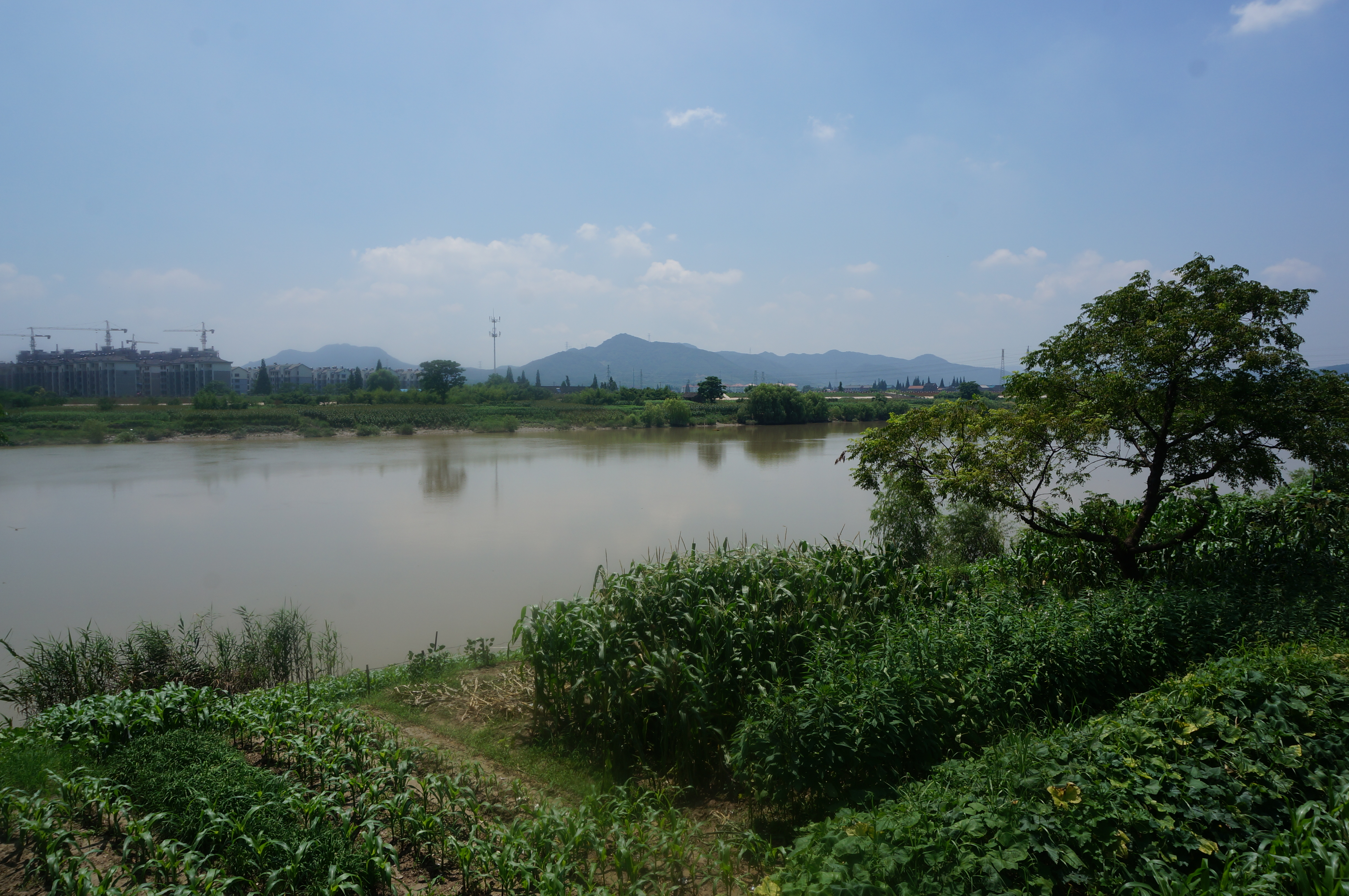
- Etymology: Cao E
- Native name: 曹娥江 (Chinese)

Location
- Country: China
- Cities: Shengzhou, Shangyu

Physical characteristics
- Source: Dapan Mountains
  - location: Pan'an County
  - coordinates: 29°7′20″N 120°38′5″E
  - elevation: 870 m (2,850 ft)
- Mouth: Hangzhou Bay
  - location: Shangyu
  - coordinates: 30°13′39.5″N 120°44′55.5″E

The Cao'e River (Chinese: 曹娥江; pinyin: Cáo'é Jiāng) is one of the largest rivers in Zhejiang Province of East China, named after Cao E, a Han dynasty girl venerated for her filial piety. Its main source is in Pan'an County in the Dapan Mountains, and the river empties into the Hangzhou Bay near the Qiantang River estuary. It has a total length of 182.4 kilometres (113.3 mi), and a basin area of 5,930.9 square kilometres (2,289.9 sq mi).

== Names ==
The Cao'e River is named after Cao E (130–143 AD), a Han dynasty girl who drowned herself in the river after her father had drowned and his body was lost. She came to be venerated as an exemplar of filial piety. In ancient times, the river was called the Shun River (舜江), after the legendary Emperor Shun, and its estuary was called Dong Xiao Jiang (东小江, East Small River). Its upper stretch is called the Chengtan River (澄潭江), and the river is also called Shanxi or Shan Creek (剡溪) near Shengzhou, and Shangyu River in Shangyu District.

== Course ==
The Cao'e River begins from the Jiangongling Mountain (尖公岭, elevation 870 meters) of the Dapan Mountains (大盘山脉). Its source, Tengxi or Teng Creek (藤溪), is located in Wangcun Village, Shanghu Town, Pan'an County. The upper stretch is called the Chengtan River, which flows northeast through Jingling Town, Chengtan Town, and southern Shengzhou, for 91 kilometres. The Chengtan River is joined by the Xinchang River in Shengzhou. After the confluence the river is called Cao'e, and is then joined by the Changle River on the left, and the Huangze River on the right. After it enters Shangyu District, the Cao'e River is joined by the Xiaguan Creek (下管溪) in Zhangzhen, and then the Xiaoshun River in Shangpu (上浦). It is then crossed by several canals including the Zhedong (East Zhejiang) Canal, before emptying into the Hangzhou Bay. It has a total length of 182.4 kilometres (113.3 mi), and a basin area of 5,930.9 square kilometres (2,289.9 sq mi).

== Main tributaries ==
The Chengtan River, the main source of Cao'e, is often considered a tributary. It is 91 kilometres (57 mi) long and has a basin area of 865 square kilometres (334 sq mi).

The Xinchang River is 52.5 kilometres (32.6 mi) long and has a basin area of 535 square kilometres (207 sq mi). It originates in Tiantai County.

The Changle River is 70.5 kilometres (43.8 mi) long and has a basin area of 864 square kilometres (334 sq mi). It originates in Dongyang and joins the Cao'e River in downtown Shengzhou.

The Huangze River is 70.6 kilometres (43.9 mi) long and has a basin area of 577 square kilometres (223 sq mi). It originates from the Xiabo Peak on the border of Ninghai and Xinchang counties.

The Xiaoshun River is 73 kilometres (45 mi) long and has a basin area of 544 square kilometres (210 sq mi). Its two main sources, South Creek and North Creek, are in Shengzhou and Shaoxing County, respectively.

== Tourism ==
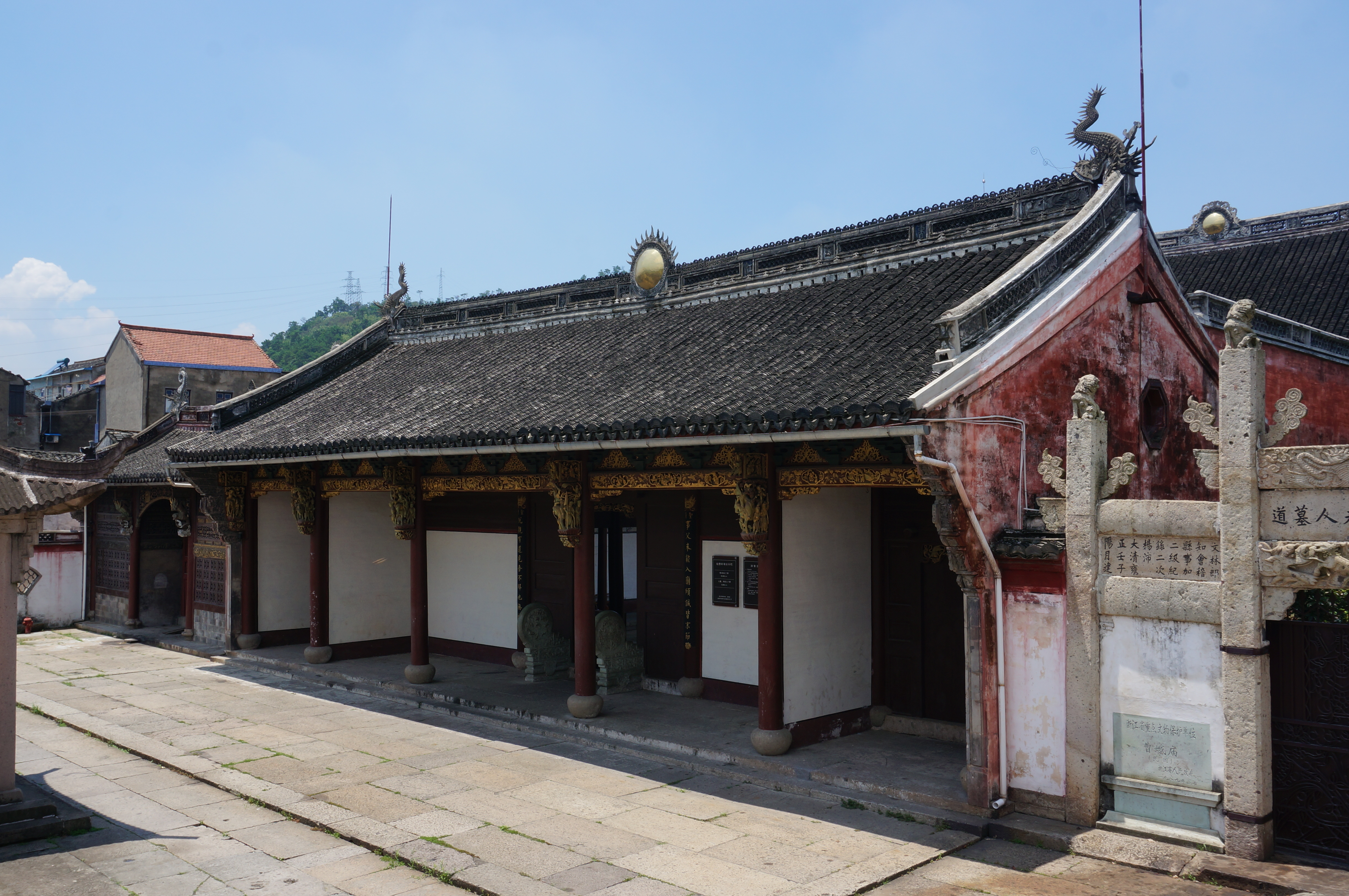
Cao E Temple, located on the bank of the Cao'e River in Shangyu

A 40-square-kilometre (15 sq mi) area of the Cao'e River basin in Shangyu is a provincial scenic area of Zhejiang. It was a popular destination for travelling poets during the Tang dynasty. A major attraction is the Cao'e Temple, built in the Song dynasty (960–1279) to commemorate the filial daughter. It has many historical carvings and boards inscribed with calligraphy from famous people. It has been called the "No. 1 temple of Jiangnan". Other sights include the hometown of Zhu Yingtai and the hermitage of the renowned Eastern Jin Prime Minister Xie An.
