= Xinchang River =

River in Zhejiang, China

Coordinates: 29.5669°N 120.8098°E

The Xinchang River (Chinese: 新昌江; pinyin: Xīnchāng Jiāng), in Zhejiang Province of East China, is one of the main tributaries of Cao'e River. It is 52.5 kilometres (32.6 mi) long and has a basin area of 535 square kilometres (207 sq mi). The river originates from Huading Mountain (华顶山, elevation 932 meters) in Tiantai County, and flows through Xinchang County, before entering Shengzhou at Huangniqiao Village. It joins the Chengtan River (upper stretch of the Cao'e River) in Shengzhou. The Changzhao Reservoir (长诏水库), also called Wozhou Lake (沃洲湖), located in the middle stretch of the Xinchang River, is a provincial scenic area.
