= Changle River =

River in Zhejiang, China

The Chengle River (Chinese: 长乐江; pinyin: Chánglè Jiāng), in Zhejiang Province of East China, is one of the main tributaries of Cao'e River. It was formerly called Xijiang or West River (西江).

== Geography ==
The river is 70.5 kilometres (43.8 mi) long and has a basin area of 864 square kilometres (334 sq mi). It originates from Daoshangling Mountain (道尚岭, elevation 744 meters) in Dongyang, and is known as Lüxi River (绿溪江) and Heshan River (合山江) in Shengzhou. It joins the Chengtan River (upper stretch of the Cao'e River) after flowing through downtown Shengzhou.

Changle River has many tributaries, including Nanshan River (南山江), Dakun or Great Kun River (大昆江), Xiaokun or Little Kun River (小昆江), Yazhang River (雅张江), Shancheng River (剡城江), Shihuang River (石璜江), Furun River (富润江), and Chongren River (崇仁江).
