= Shuyuan station =

Shanghai Metro station

Shuyuan 书院
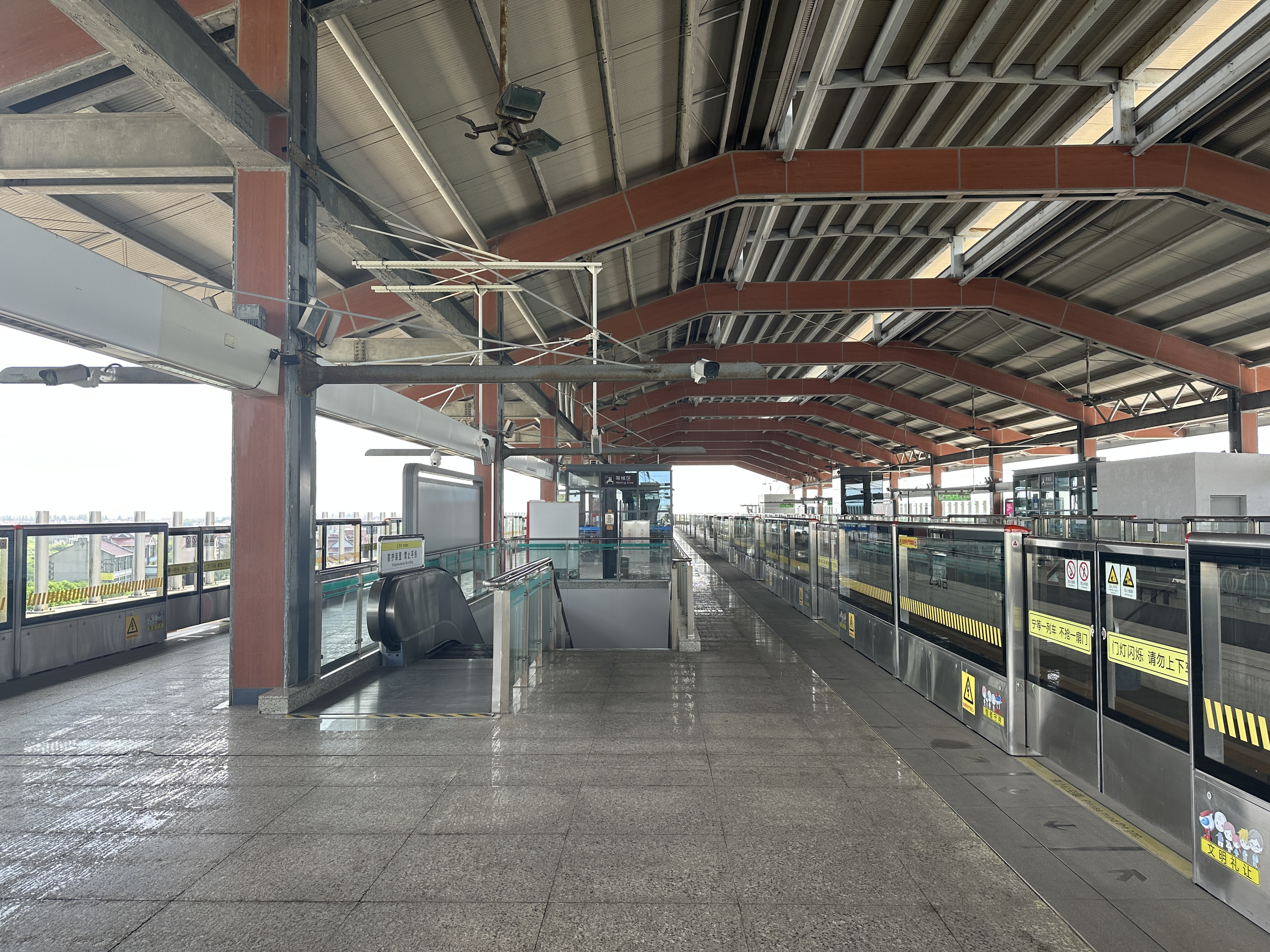
- Station platform

General information
- Location: Pudong, Shanghai; China
- Coordinates: 30.96156°N 121.84640°E
- Line: Line 16
- Platforms: 3 (1 island and 1 side platform)
- Tracks: 3

Construction
- Structure type: Elevated
- Accessible: Yes

History
- Opened: 29 December 2013

Services
Preceding station	Shanghai Metro	Following station
East Huinan towards Longyang Road	Line 16	Lingang Avenue towards Dishui Lake
Location
- Location within Shanghai

Shuyuan (simplified Chinese: 书院; traditional Chinese: 書院; pinyin: Shūyuàn) is a station on Line 16 of the Shanghai Metro in Pudong, Shanghai. It opened on 29 December 2013 as part of the first section of Line 16 from Luoshan Road to Dishui Lake.

The station has 3 tracks, one island platform, and one side platform. The inner island platform is not in service. Trains heading to Longyang Road use the outer island platform, whilst trains towards Dishui Lake use the side platform. This station utilizes the same platform layout as one of its neighbouring stations, Lingang Avenue, on the same line. Express trains heading to Longyang Road usually pass through the inner island platform.
