= East Hangtou station =

Shanghai Metro station

East Hangtou 航头东
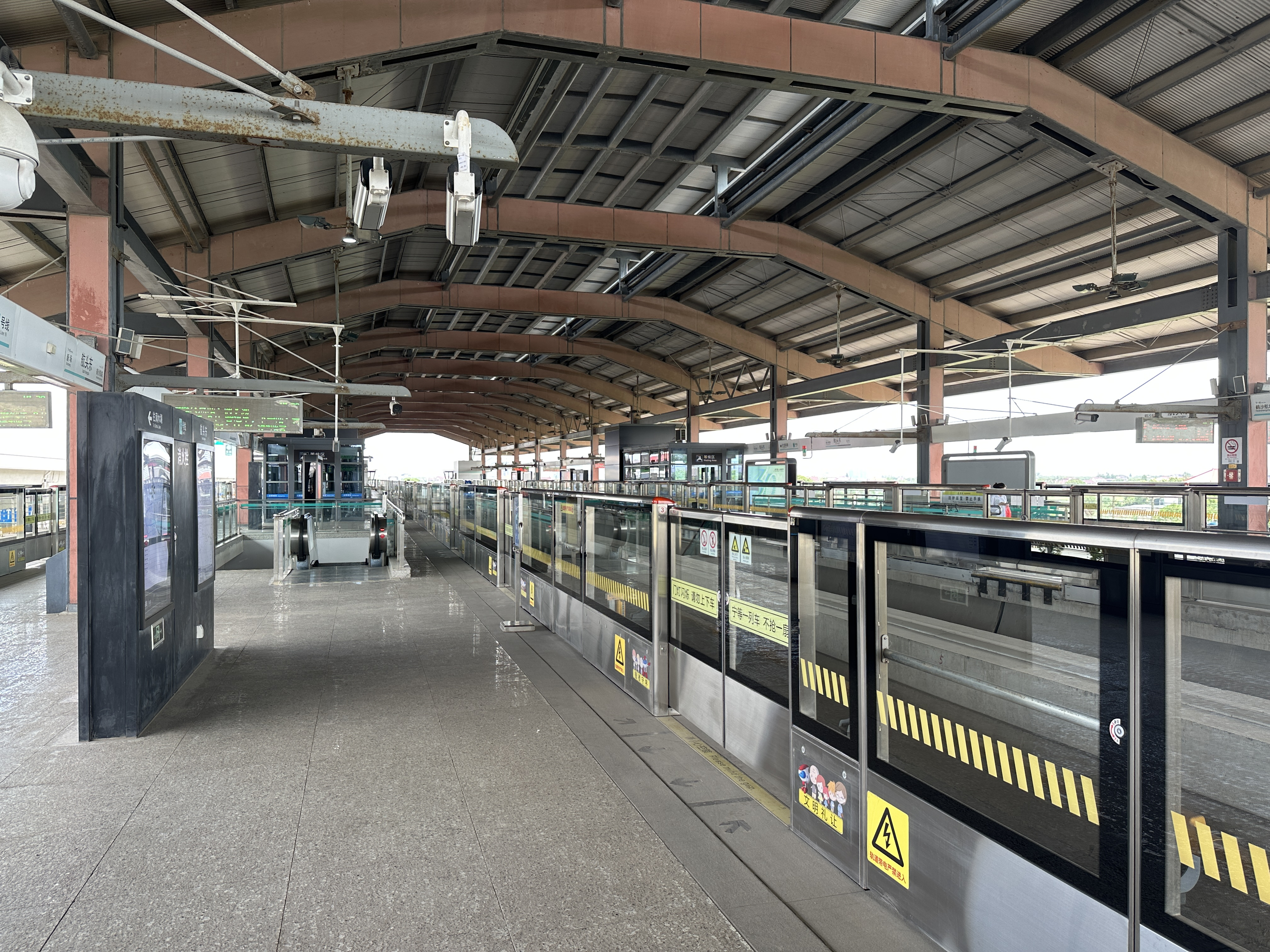
- Station platform

General information
- Location: East Heli Road (鹤立东路); Pudong New Area, Shanghai; China
- Coordinates: 31.054°N 121.617°E
- Line: Line 16
- Platforms: 4 (2 island platforms)
- Tracks: 4

Construction
- Structure type: Elevated
- Accessible: Yes

History
- Opened: 29 December 2013

Services
Preceding station	Shanghai Metro	Following station
Heshahangcheng towards Longyang Road	Line 16	Xinchang towards Dishui Lake
Location
- Location within Shanghai

East Hangtou (simplified Chinese: 航头东; traditional Chinese: 航頭東; pinyin: Hángtóu Dōng) is a Shanghai Metro station in the Pudong New Area of Shanghai. It is on Line 16 between Heshahangcheng and Xinchang and opened on 29 December 2013.

The station has 4 platforms, but only the 2 outer platforms are in regular service. Express trains usually pass through the middle 2 tracks.

== Exit list ==
- Exit 1: Transit Hub
- Exit 2: Near Xiasha Road
