= Huinan station =

Shanghai Metro station

Huinan 惠南
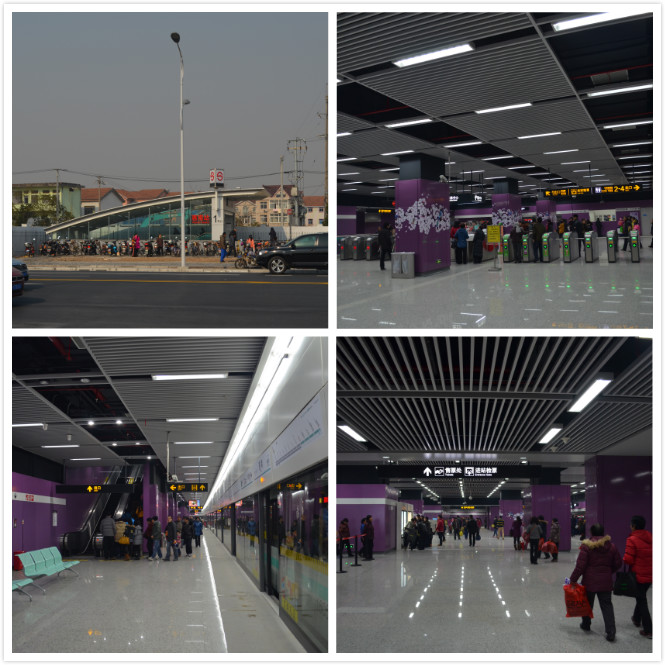

General information
- Location: Gongji Road (拱极路) and Chuannanfeng Highway (川南奉公路); Huinan, Pudong, Shanghai; China
- Coordinates: 31.05599°N 121.7573105°E
- Line: Line 16
- Platforms: 2 (2 side platforms)
- Tracks: 2

Construction
- Structure type: Underground
- Accessible: Yes

History
- Opened: 29 December 2013

Services
Preceding station	Shanghai Metro	Following station
Wild Animal Park towards Longyang Road	Line 16	East Huinan towards Dishui Lake
Xinchang towards Longyang Road	Line 16 Express service	Lingang Avenue towards Dishui Lake
Location
- Location within Shanghai

Huinan (Chinese: 惠南; pinyin: Huìnán) is a station on Line 16 of the Shanghai Metro in Pudong, Shanghai. It opened on 29 December 2013 as part of the first section of Line 16 from Luoshan Road to Dishui Lake.
