= Wild Animal Park station =

Shanghai Metro station

Wild Animal Park 野生动物园
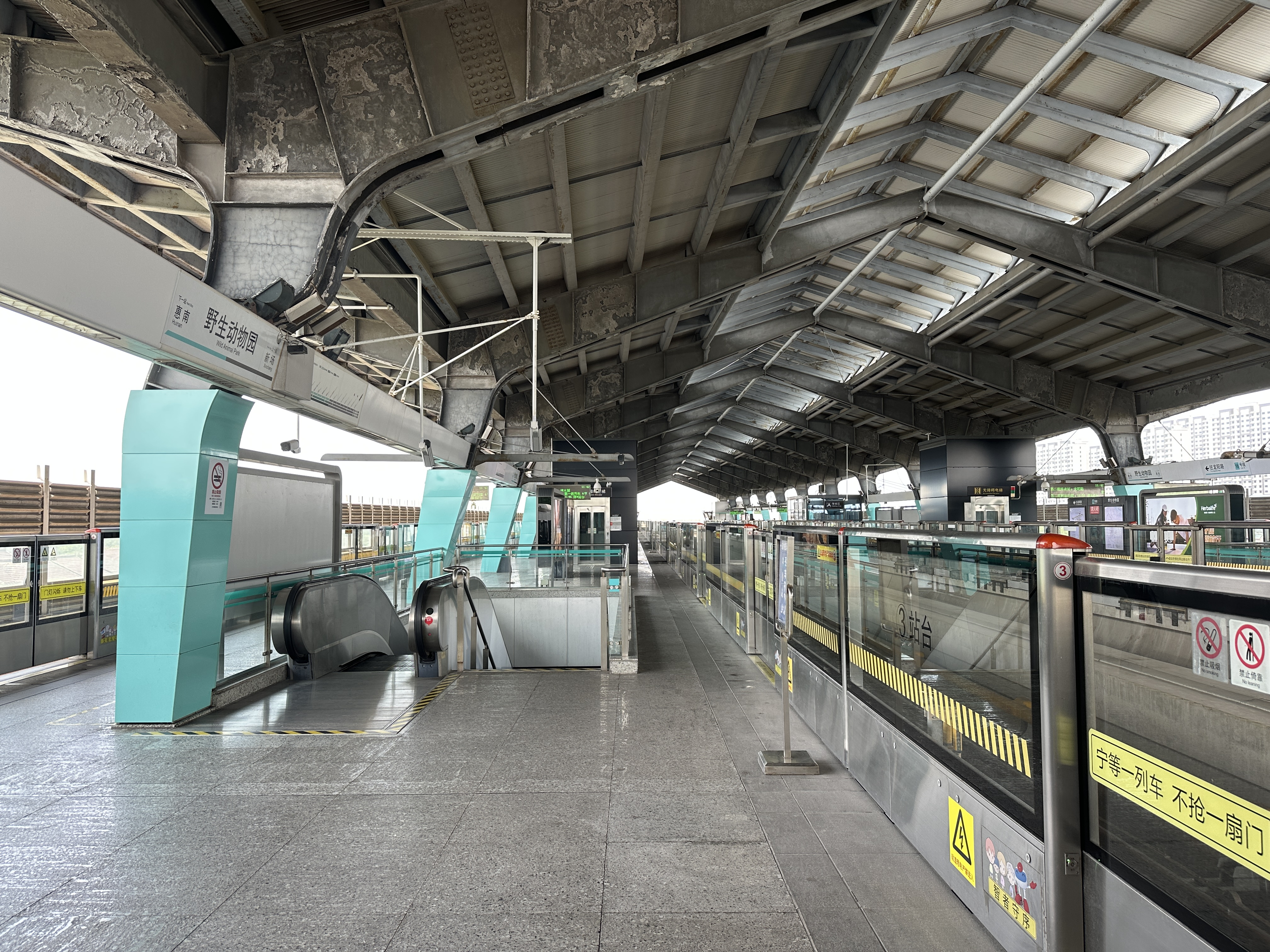
- Station platform

General information
- Location: West Renmin Road (人民西路); Xuanqiao, Pudong, Shanghai; China
- Coordinates: 31.0524°N 121.6948°E
- Line: Line 16
- Platforms: 4 (2 island platforms)
- Tracks: 4

Construction
- Structure type: Elevated
- Accessible: Yes

History
- Opened: 29 December 2013

Services
Preceding station	Shanghai Metro	Following station
Xinchang towards Longyang Road	Line 16	Huinan towards Dishui Lake
Location
- Location within Shanghai

Wild Animal Park (simplified Chinese: 野生动物园; traditional Chinese: 野生動物園; pinyin: Yěshēng Dòngwùyuán) is a station on Line 16 of the Shanghai Metro. The station is near the Shanghai Wild Animal Park (zh). It opened on 29 December 2013 as part of the first section of Line 16 from Luoshan Road to Dishui Lake.

The station has 4 platforms, but only the 2 outer platforms are in regular service. Express trains usually pass through the middle 2 tracks.
