= East Huinan station =

Shanghai Metro station

East Huinan 惠南东
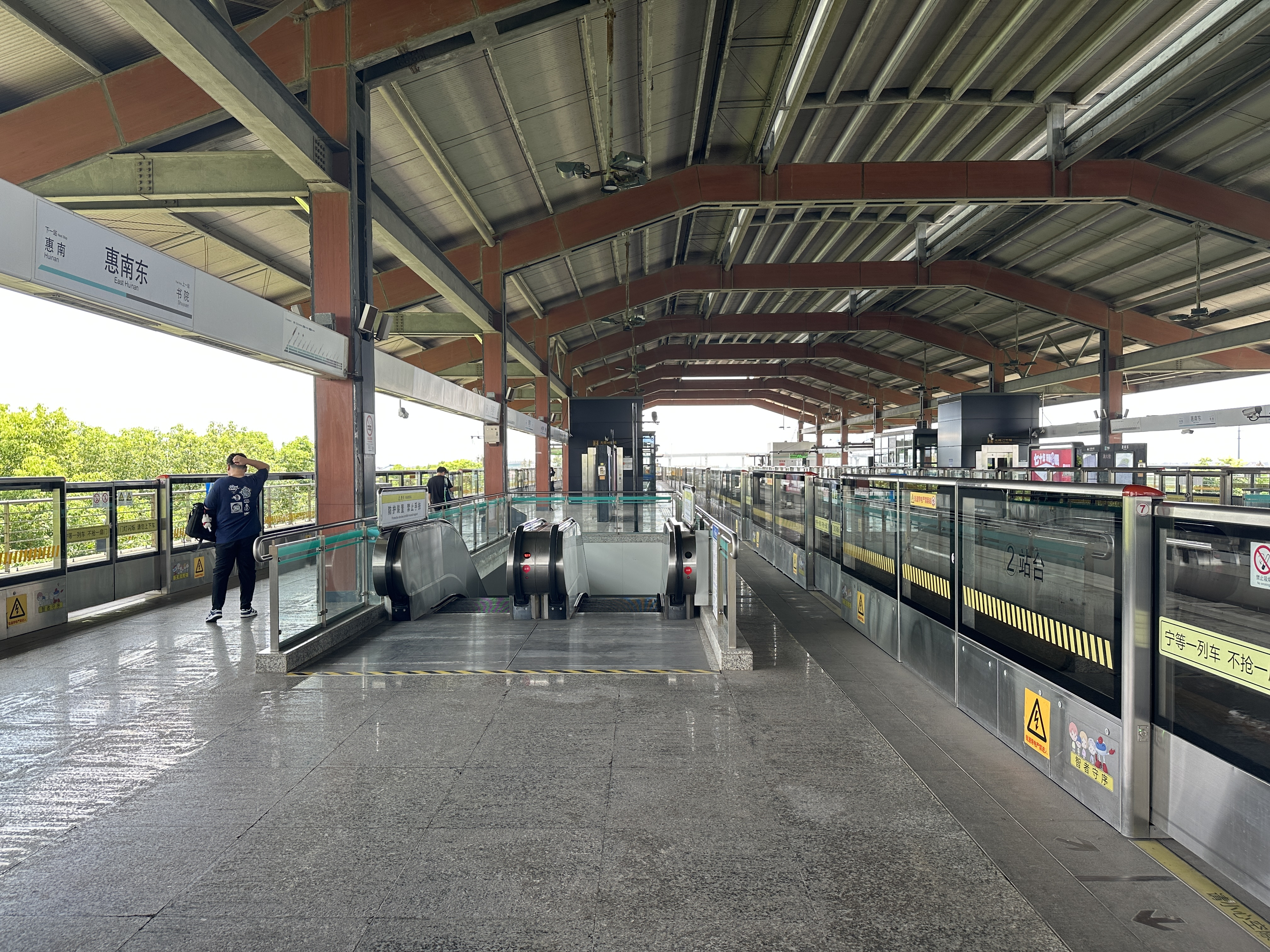
- Station platform

General information
- Location: Hu'nan Highway, Huinan, Pudong, Shanghai; China
- Coordinates: 31.028619°N 121.789445°E
- Line: Line 16
- Platforms: 4 (2 island platforms)
- Tracks: 4

Construction
- Structure type: Elevated
- Accessible: Yes

History
- Opened: 29 December 2013

Services
Preceding station	Shanghai Metro	Following station
Huinan towards Longyang Road	Line 16	Shuyuan towards Dishui Lake
Location
- Location within Shanghai

East Huinan (simplified Chinese: 惠南东; traditional Chinese: 惠南東; pinyin: Huìnán Dōng) is a station on Line 16 of the Shanghai Metro in Pudong, Shanghai. It opened on 29 December 2013 as part of the first section of Line 16 from Luoshan Road to Dishui Lake.

The station has 4 platforms, but only the 2 outer platforms are in regular service. Express trains usually pass through the middle 2 tracks. The station is in Haishen Village. The roof above the elevated platforms is designed in a traditional Chinese style.
