= Yulin Subdistrict, Xinchang County =

Yulin Subdistrict 羽林街道
- Subdistrict
- Location in Zhejiang
- Coordinates: 29.5062°N 120.9179°E
- Country: People's Republic of China
- Province: Zhejiang
- Prefecture-level city: Shaoxing
- County: Xinchang County
- Time zone: UTC+8 (China Standard)

Yulin Subdistrict (Chinese: 羽林街道; pinyin: Yǔlín Jiēdào) is a subdistrict in Xinchang County, Zhejiang, China. As of 2018, it has one residential community, 42 villages, and one water reservoir community under its administration.

== See also ==
- List of township-level divisions of Zhejiang
