= Dafo Temple (Zhangye) =

Buddhist temple in Zhangye, China

- 大佛寺
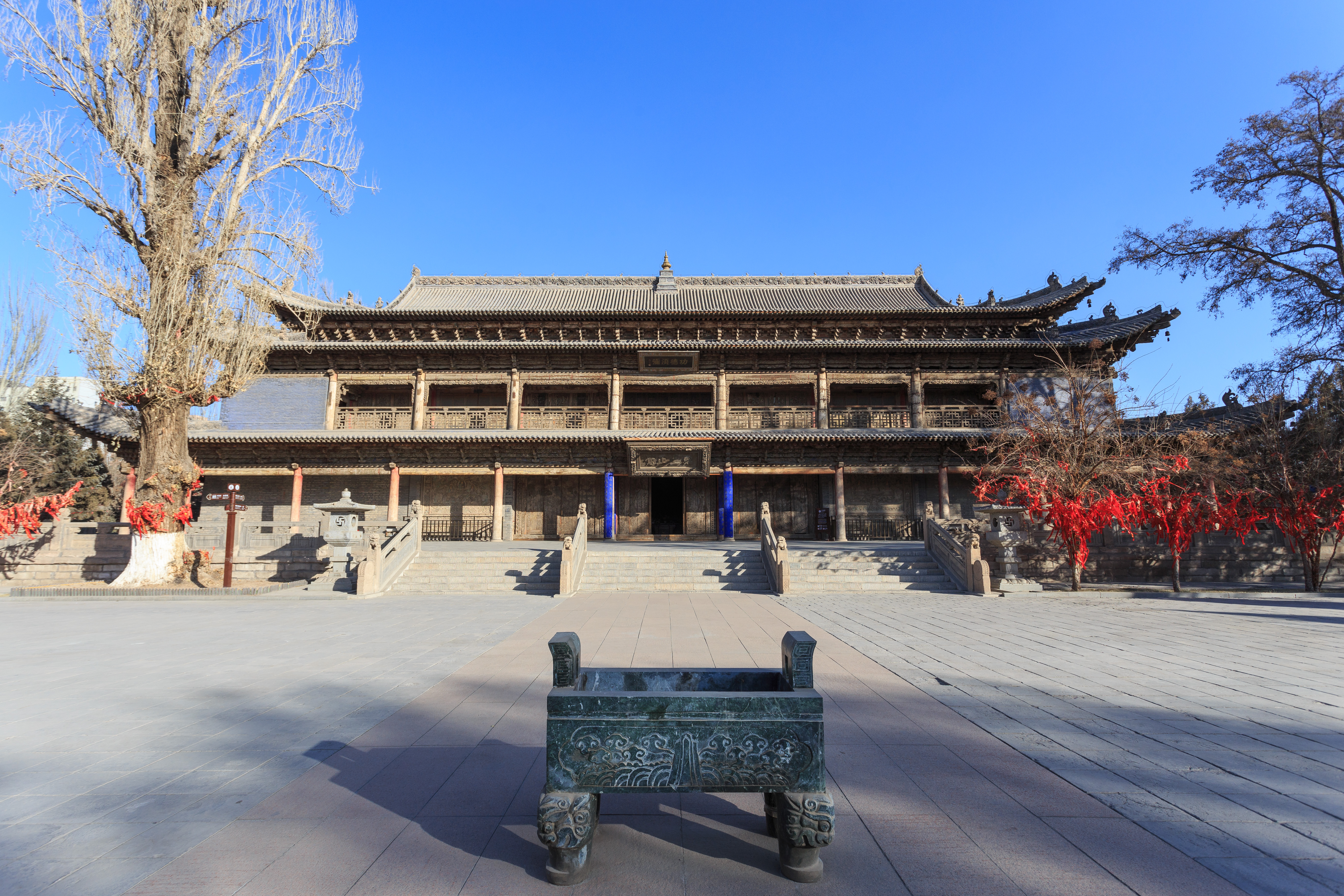
- The main hall containing the reclining Buddha statue.

- Location within Gansu Location within China

Religion
- Affiliation: Buddhism

Location
- Location: Zhangye, Gansu
- Country: China
- Coordinates: 38°55′48″N 100°27′15″E

Architecture
- Style: Chinese architecture
- Established: 1098

Website
- www.zydfs.com

The Dafo Temple or Great Buddha Temple (Chinese: 大佛寺; pinyin: Dàfó Sì) is a Buddhist temple in Zhangye, Gansu, China, notable for its gigantic reclining Buddha statue made around 1100 during the Western Xia period, which is thirty-five metres long and is reputedly the largest reclining Buddha clay statue in China. After a restoration project in 2005–06, the Temple now attracts thousands of visitors. It has had several names over the centuries, including the "Kasyapa Buddha Temple" (迦叶如来寺), the "Bojue Temple" (宝觉寺), the "Hongren Temple" (宏仁寺), and the "Reclining Buddha Temple" (卧佛寺). The present name of "Dafo" means "Great Buddha".

== History ==
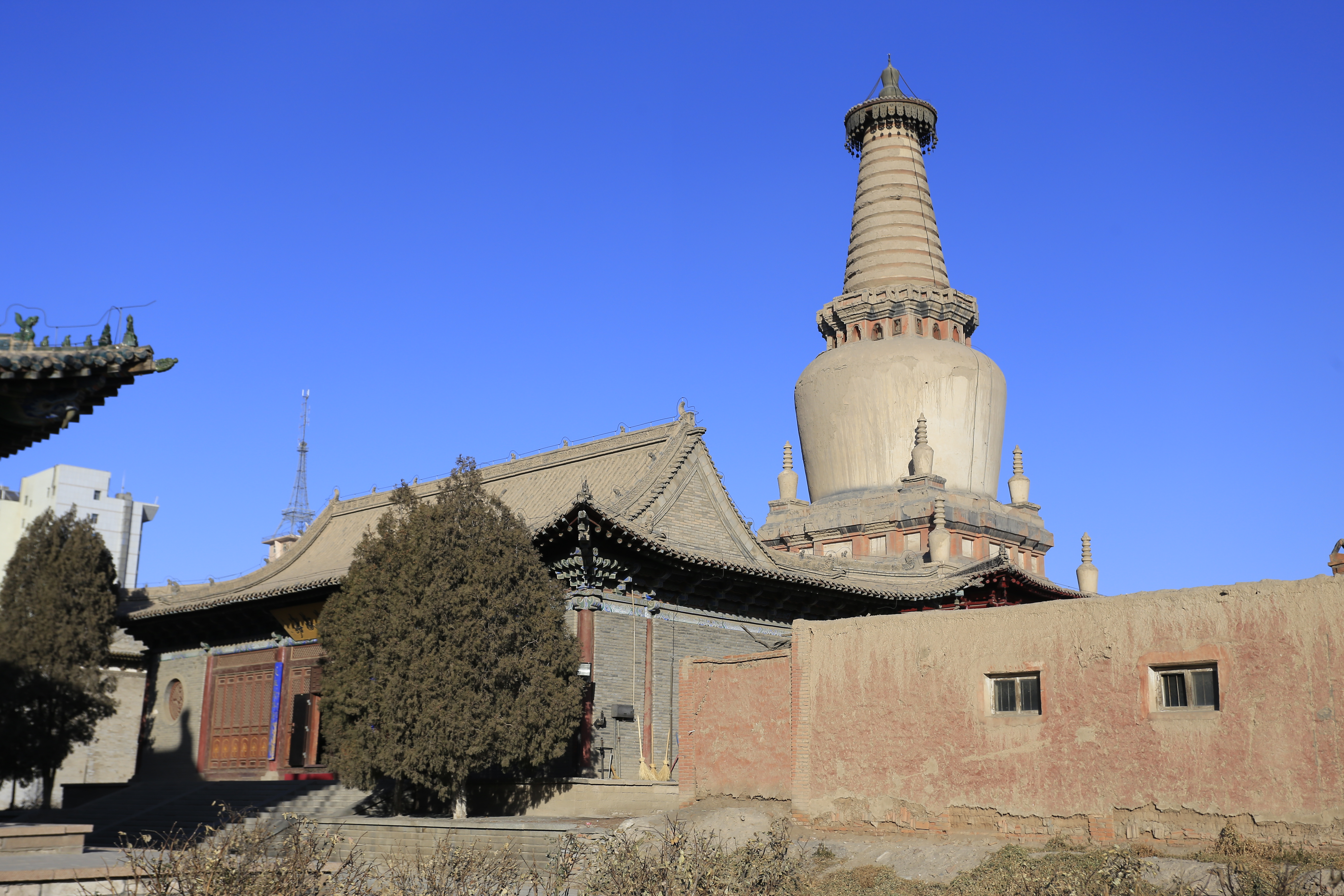
The Hall of Scriptures and stupa

The temple was built around the beginning of the 12th century, during the Western Xia (1038–1227) period. In 1028, the Tibeto-Burman speaking Tangut people took over Zhangye (then known as Ganzhou) from the Ganzhou Uyghur Kingdom. A few years later they founded the Western Xia and controlled the entirety of the Hexi Corridor. To strengthen their hold over the area, the Xia built temples and ordered the translation of the Buddhist scriptures. They were especially strong during the reign of the Emperor Chongzong of Western Xia (1086–1139), and the Dafo Temple dates from this time.

The history of the temple relates that in 1098, a monk called Sineng Weimie had seen numinous lights and heard heavenly sounds coming from a nearby hill at the foot of a mountain. Investigating the area, Sineng unearthed a hoard which included a reclining Buddha statue and set out to build a great temple in honour of the image, which he believed had been revealed by divine favour. The nirvana image in the temple has a long history of patrons and visitors and has been protected for centuries by its Buddhist monks, but it has also suffered from decay and restoration. Protecting it was most difficult during the Cultural Revolution.

There is a story that Kublai Khan (1215–1294) was born in the temple, while his mother was living there, and another that Bing, the last Song dynasty (960–1279) emperor, was exiled to Zhangye and became a monk in the temple. However, Ruth W. Dunnell has reported that she has been unable to find evidence to support either of these claims. She notes that they "illustrate the accretion of legend around this particular Buddhist site".

In 1372, much of the temple was razed to the ground by the Ming army as they captured Ganzhou. Reconstruction started in 1411 and completed in 1419. It was renamed "Hongren Temple" by the emperor, and the newly rebuilt temple featured 9 buildings along the main east-west axis alone. The newly inaugurated temple was documented in detail by the Timurid envoy Ghiyath al-Din Naqqash in 1420.

The Hall of Scriptures has a double wall behind it and is forty metres long, twenty metres high. In 1996 the temple was added to the list of major national historical and cultural sites and the Beijing Review reported that 6,000 volumes of ancient Buddhist scriptures survived in the temple.

In 2005, the temple was reinstated as a place of worship, and the next year it was re-opened after a major restoration which aimed to promote it as a tourist attraction. On 1 July 2006, dozens of Buddhist masters blessed a large crowd which attended, in the largest gathering seen at the temple for more than a hundred years.

== The statue and its hall ==
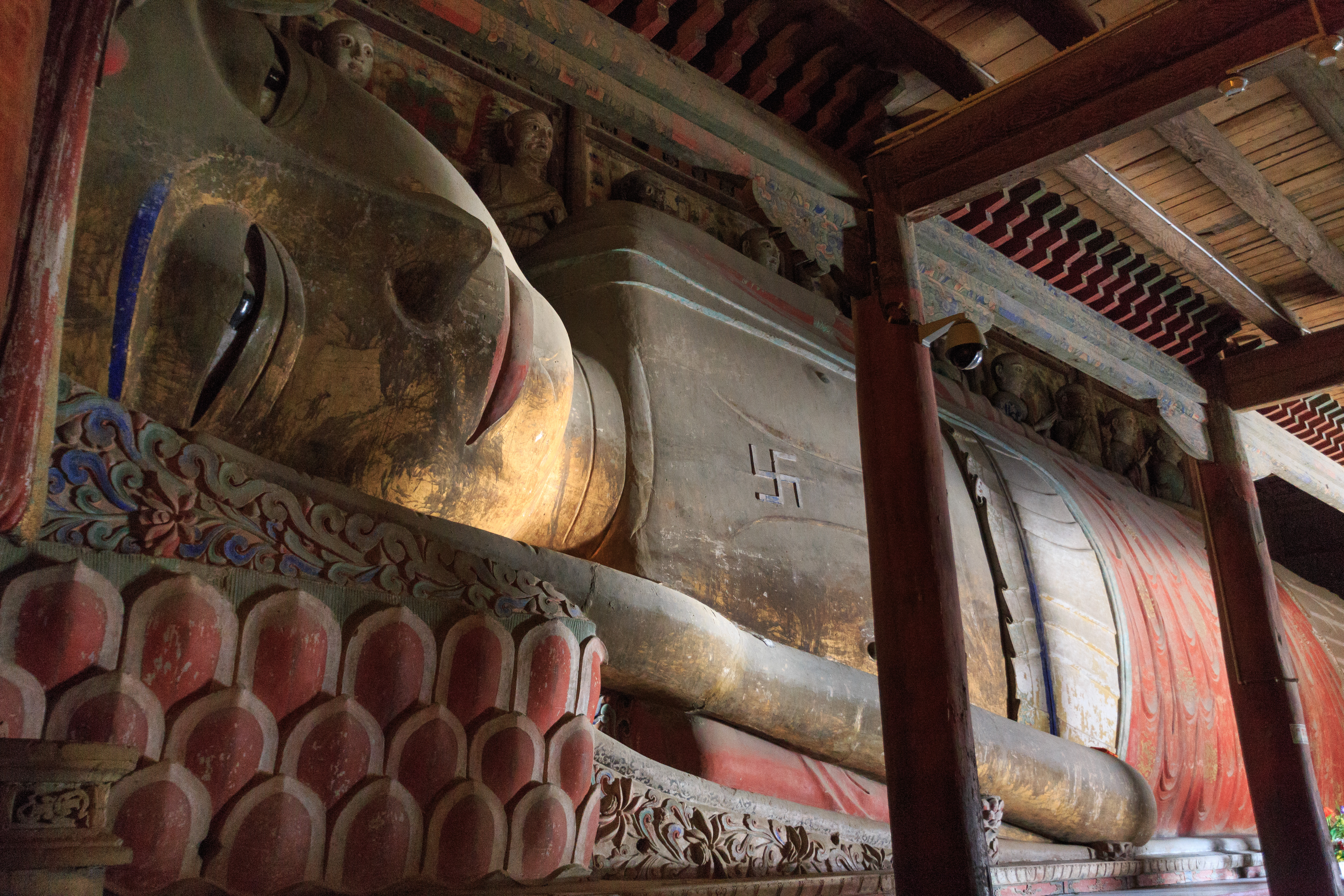
The reclining Buddha

The temple's huge statue is made of clay on a wooden frame and depicts the Gautama Buddha's attainment of nirvana, with his ten disciples standing behind him. It is largely unaltered since the time of the Western Xia (1038–1227). With a length of some 35 metres (115 ft), it is reportedly the largest reclining clay Buddha statue in China.

The hall which contains the Buddha is 48 metres (157 ft) long and 24 metres (79 ft) wide, with a height of 33 metres (108 ft) and is one of the few wooden structures of the Western Xia period which survive. It has a Qing dynasty (1644–1911) mural which tells the story of Xuanzang and his followers, showing Xuanzang riding on a horse and the monkey king Sun Wukong kneeling on the ground.

== See also ==
- Dafo Temple (Xinchang)
- Leshan Giant Buddha
