= Xinchang station =

Shanghai Metro station

Xinchang 新场
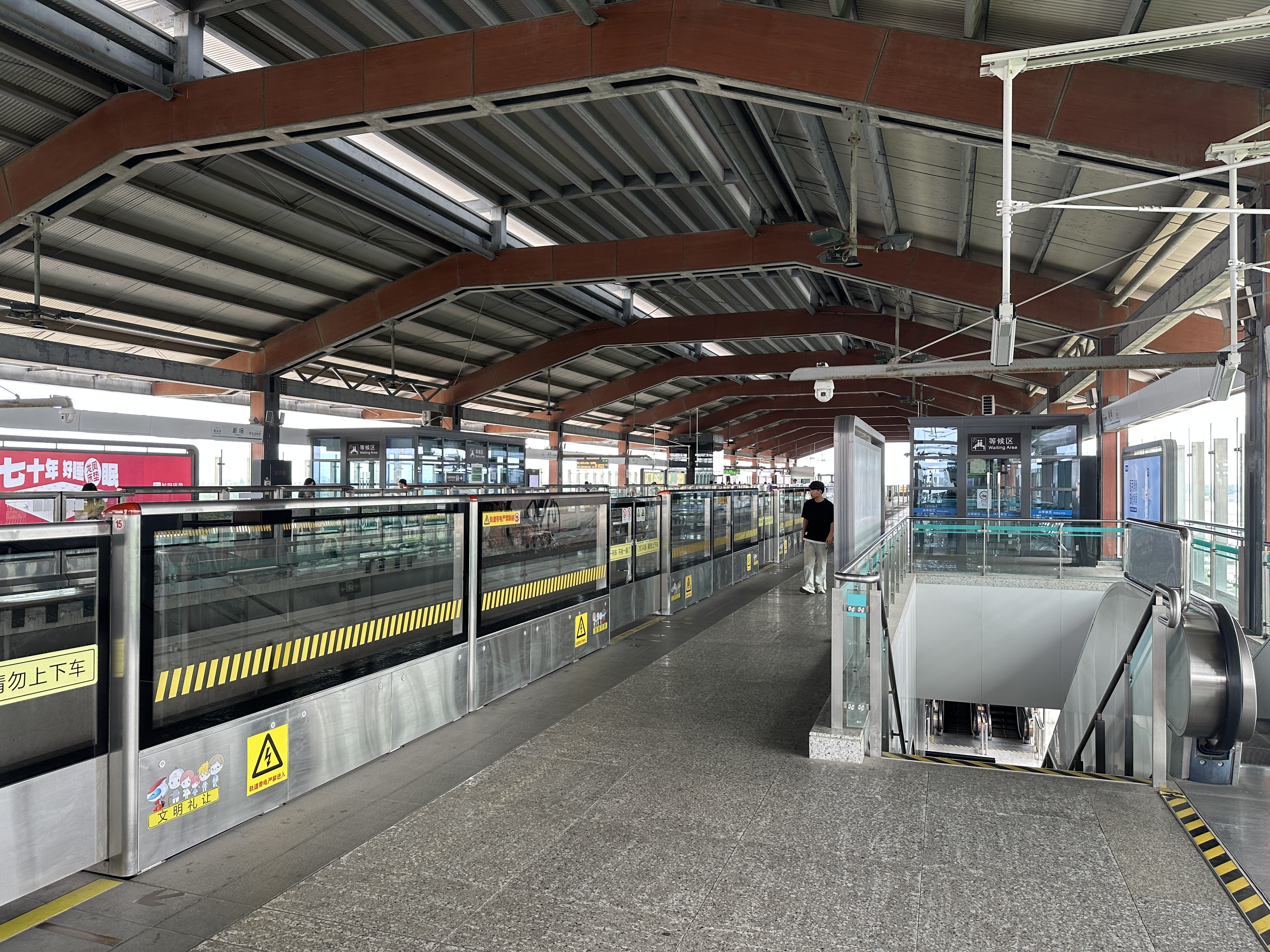
- Station platform

General information
- Location: Hangsan Highway (航三公路) at South Shenjiang Road (申江南路); Xinchang, Pudong, Shanghai; China
- Coordinates: 31.0449°N 121.648°E
- Line: Line 16
- Platforms: 2 (2 side platforms)
- Tracks: 2
- Connections: bus stop

Construction
- Structure type: Elevated
- Accessible: Yes

History
- Opened: 29 December 2013

Services
Preceding station	Shanghai Metro	Following station
East Hangtou towards Longyang Road	Line 16	Wild Animal Park towards Dishui Lake
Luoshan Road towards Longyang Road	Line 16 Express service	Huinan towards Dishui Lake
Location
- Location within Shanghai

Xinchang (simplified Chinese: 新场; traditional Chinese: 新場; pinyin: Xīnchǎng) is a station on Line 16 of the Shanghai Metro in Pudong, Shanghai. It opened on 29 December 2013 as part of the first section of Line 16 from Luoshan Road to Dishui Lake. It is connected to a bus stop, and it is only 1 km along South Shenjiang Road from Xinchang Ancient Town.
