= Dafo Temple (Xinchang) =

Buddhist temple in Zhejiang, China

- 大佛寺
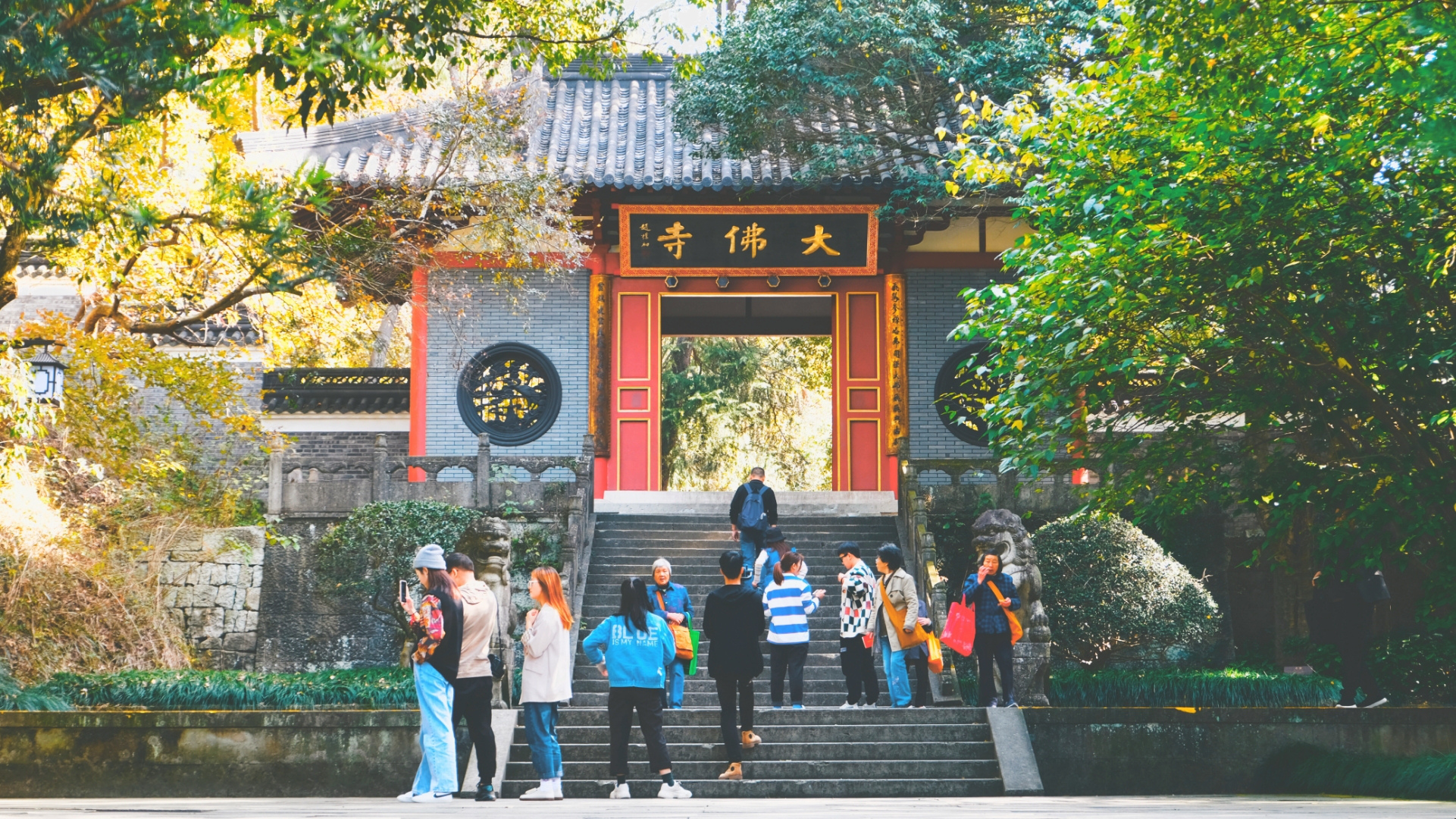
- Shanmen

- Location within Zhejiang

Religion
- Affiliation: Buddhism
- Sect: Chan Buddhism

Location
- Location: Xinchang County, Zhejiang, China
- Interactive map of Dafo Temple
- Coordinates: 29°29′46″N 120°53′05″E

Architecture
- Style: Chinese architecture
- Founder: Tanguang (曇光)
- Established: 345–356
- Completed: 1871–1908 (reconstruction)

The Dafo Temple (Chinese: 大佛寺; pinyin: Dàfó Sì) is a famous Buddhist temple in Zhejiang and has a long history of more than 1600 years. This Temple is the symbol of the Xinchang County and it attracts tens of thousands of visitors every year. Recently, the temple and its surroundings have been used as a location for movies and filming, because of its natural environment.

== Local Power ==
During the Cultural Revolution, locals tactfully covered the giant Buddha statues in the temple with pictures of Mao Zedong that managed to prevent the fanatic red guards from destroying the sacred statues, which they were inspired to do under the radical directive of "destroying all old traditions".

== Big Buddha ==
Dafo Temple itself is constructed with five levels with several halls like the Heavenly King Hall, the Dafo (Big Buddha) Hall and the Scripture Hall. The Big Buddha is almost 15 meters in height, its nose alone is 1.5 meters and ears are 2.7 meters in size. It is believed that the statue is about 1,600 years old from the Eastern Jin Dynasty (317-420) and is around the same time that Buddhism began spreading from India to China.

In the surrounding area is a grotto which is considered amongst China's earliest, and where a number of Buddha statues are to be found, including a reclining Buddha, a waterfall and a petrified forest.

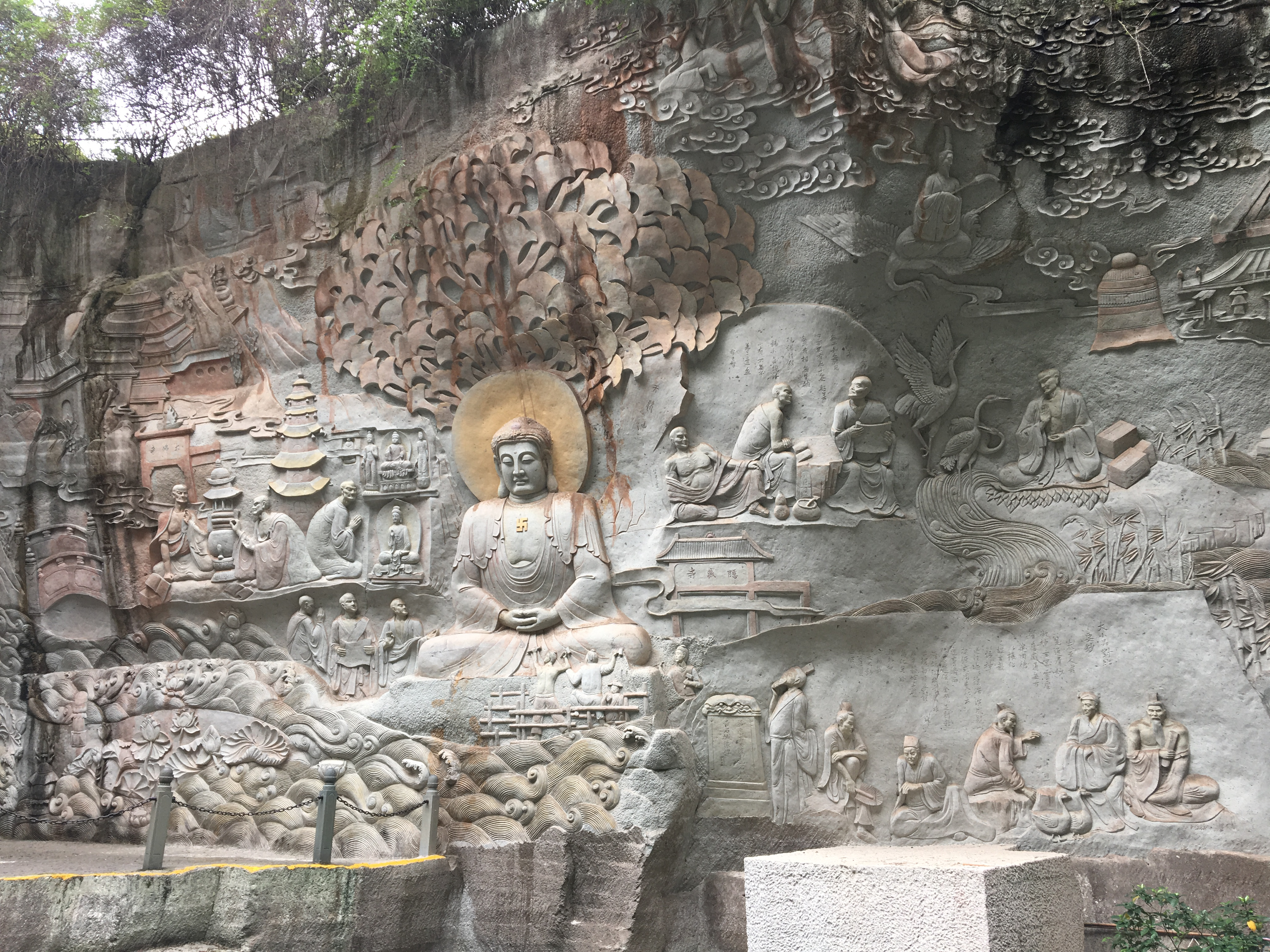
Dafo Temple

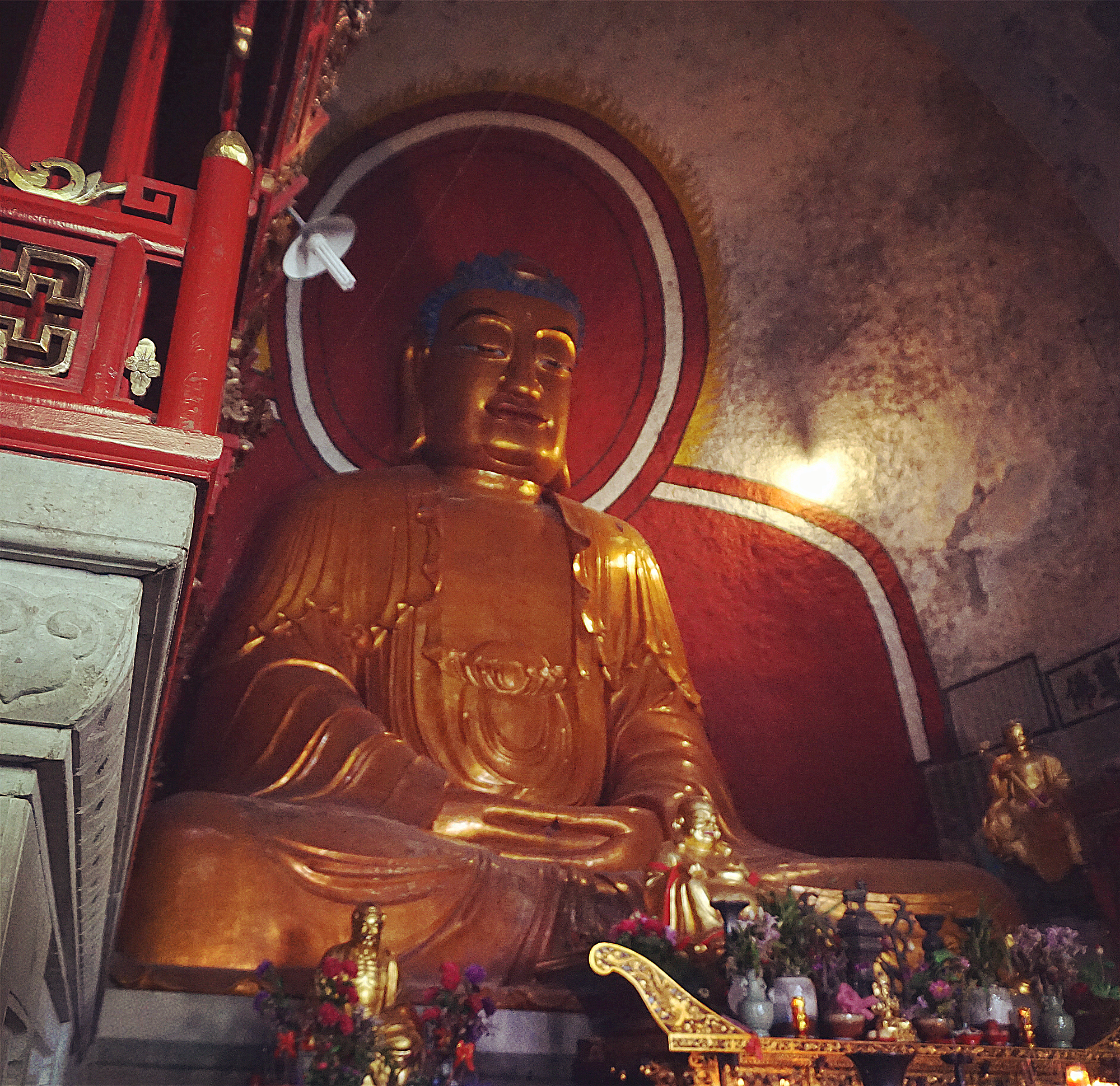
Big Buddha Hall and the Scripture Hall

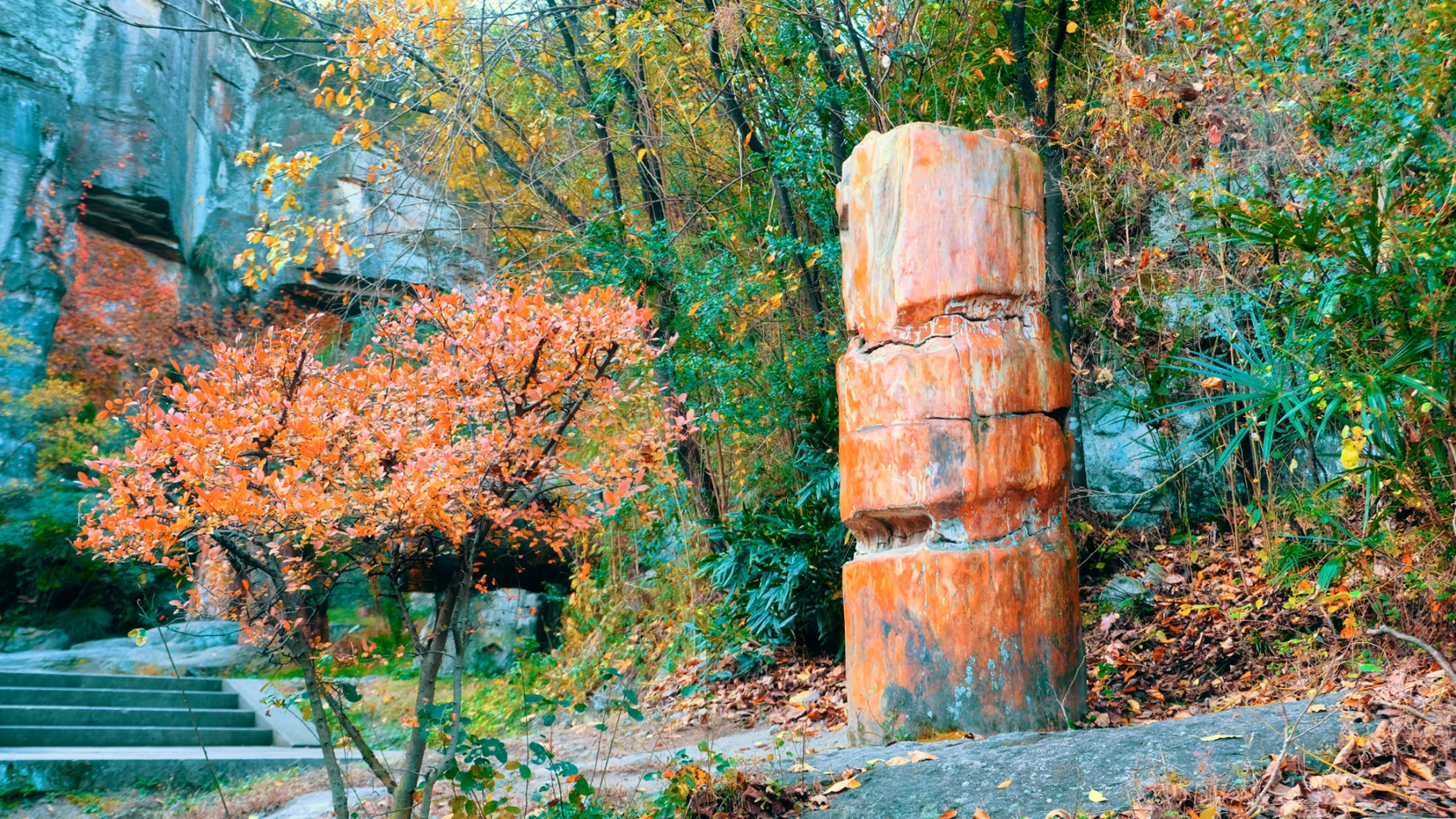
petrified forest

== See also ==
- Dafo Temple, Zhangye
- Dafo Temple (Guangzhou)
