= DAFO =

Type of ankle foot orthosis

A DAFO (Dynamic Ankle Foot Orthosis) is a brand name for some lower extremity braces that provide thin, flexible, external support to the foot, ankle and/or lower leg. They have the particularity to fit firmly the ankle and correct concisely the foot deformity within special pressure points. It is stated to help in improving mobility and stability of the ankle joint on CP patients, evidence shows that immediate gross motor function improved with the use of DAFOs as well. Designed to help a patient maintain a functional position, a DAFO can improve stability for successful standing and walking.

Different from a traditional Ankle Foot Orthosis (AFO), which is typically stiff and rigid, a DAFO is characteristically thin, flexible and wraps around the patient's entire foot in order to provide improved sensation and alignment. Initially designed for use by pediatric patients but now sometimes used by the adult population, a DAFO encourages range of motion, allowing children to learn movement by moving and providing minimal support, only where the patient needs it. DAFOs are frequently prescribed to assist with mobility and motor skills of children with cerebral palsy, spina bifida, muscular dystrophy, clubfoot and autism.

== History ==
The concept for the original DAFO was developed in 1985 as collaboration between Don Buethorn, CPO, and Nancy M. Hylton, PT, LO. The two worked together to create a thin, flexible brace that would meet the needs of pediatric patients with neurodevelopment challenges and the result was the creation of a Washington state-based company, Cascade Dafo, Inc.
