= Shangyu, Shaoxing =

Shangyu 上虞区
- District
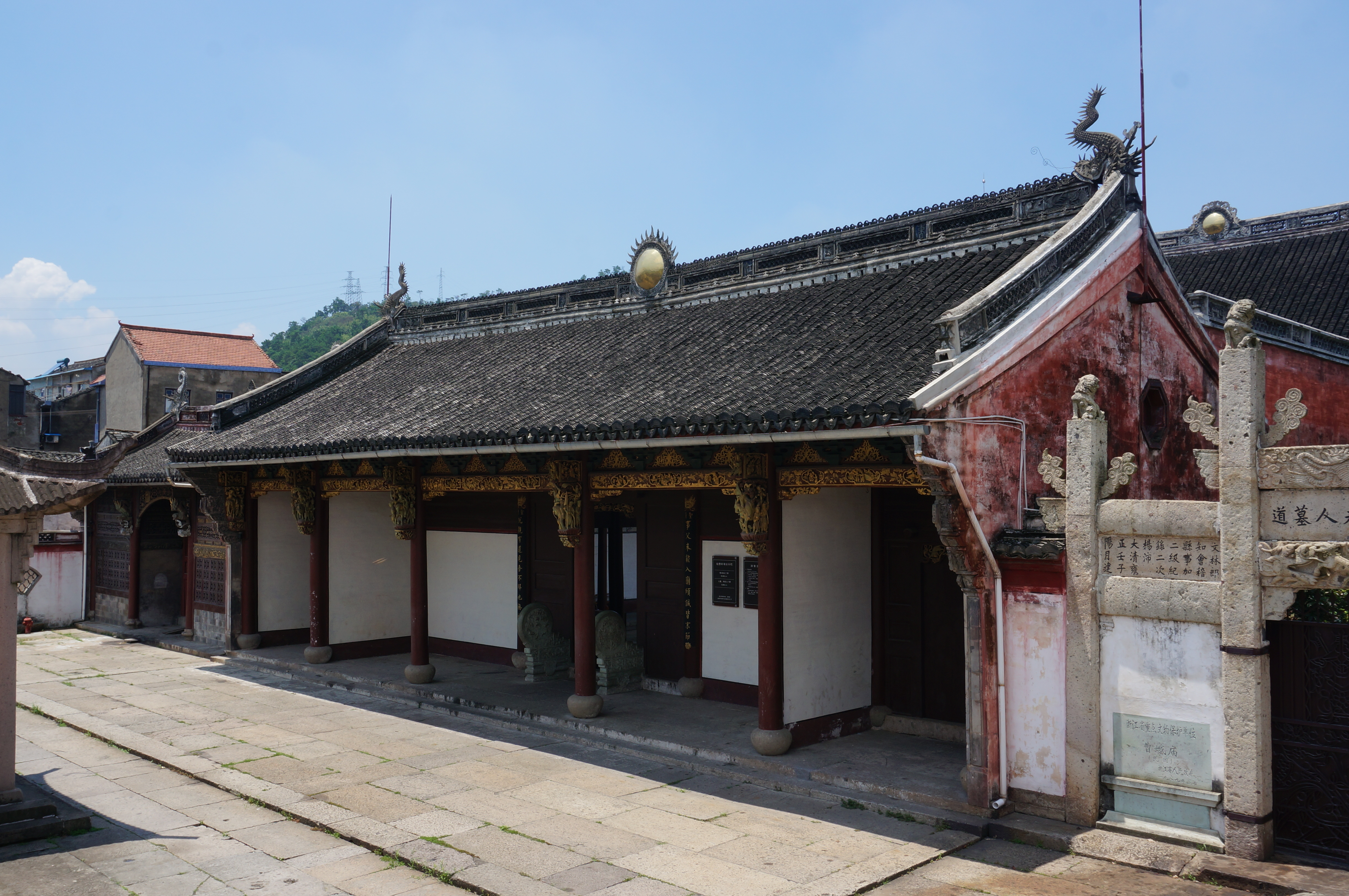
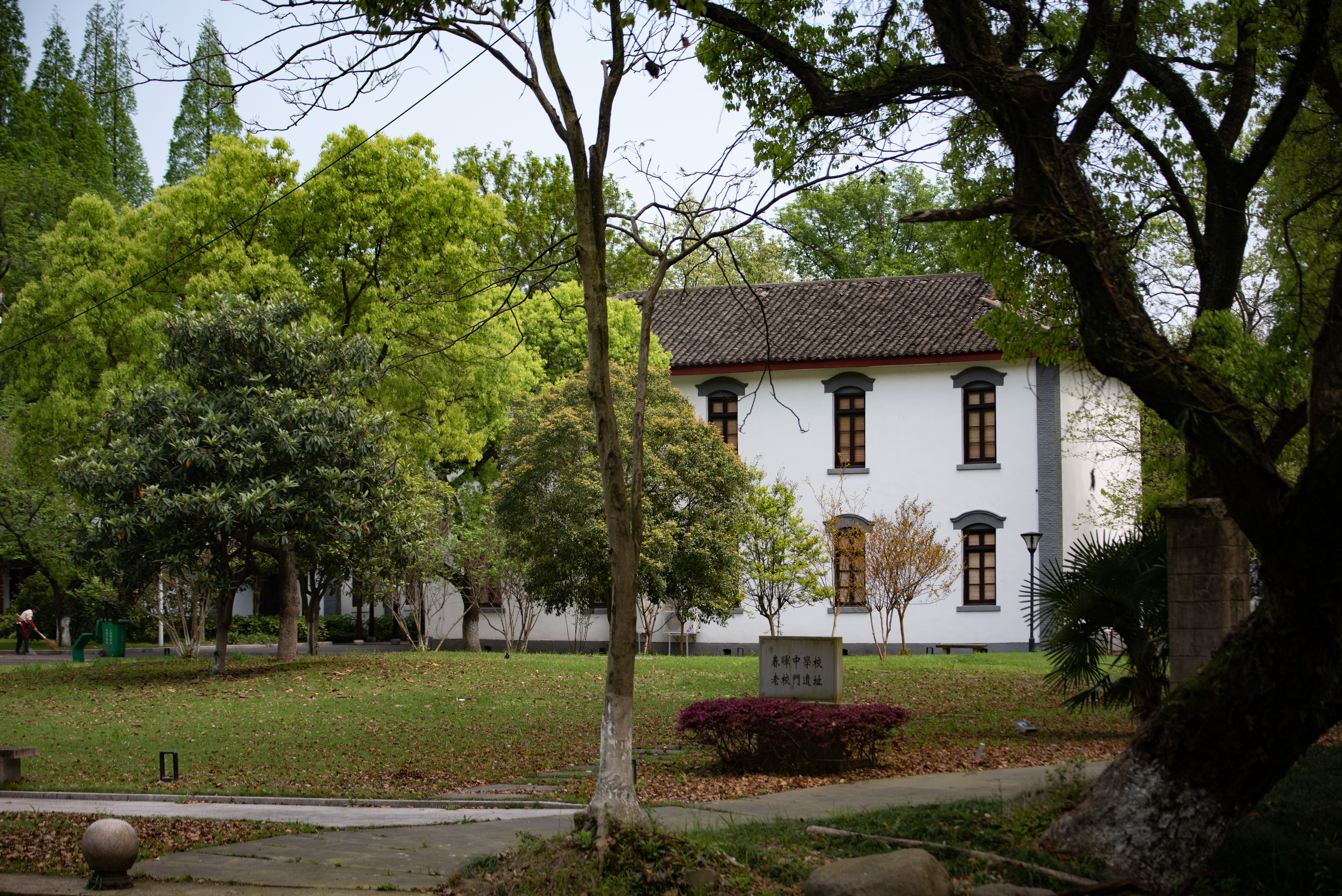
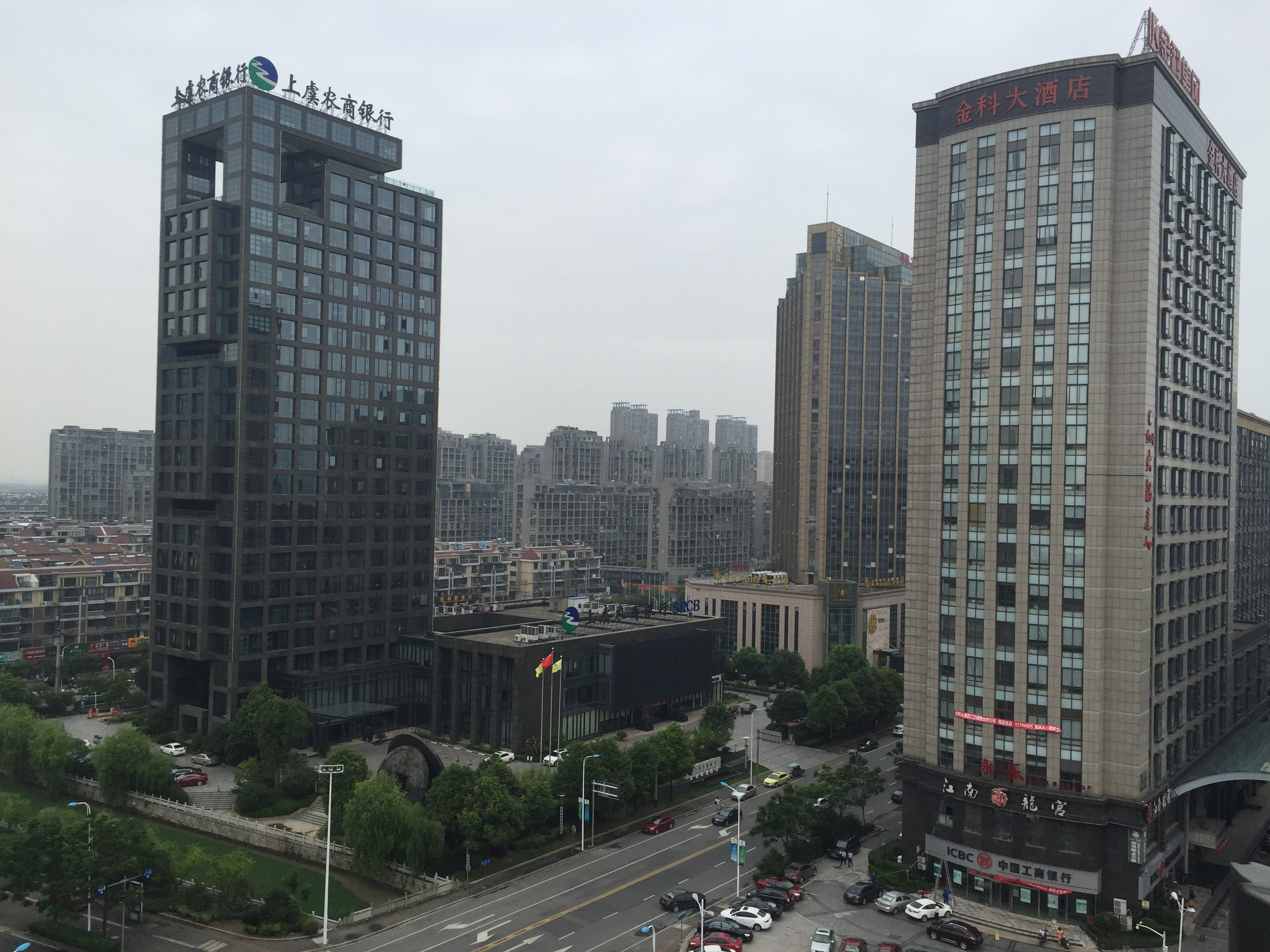
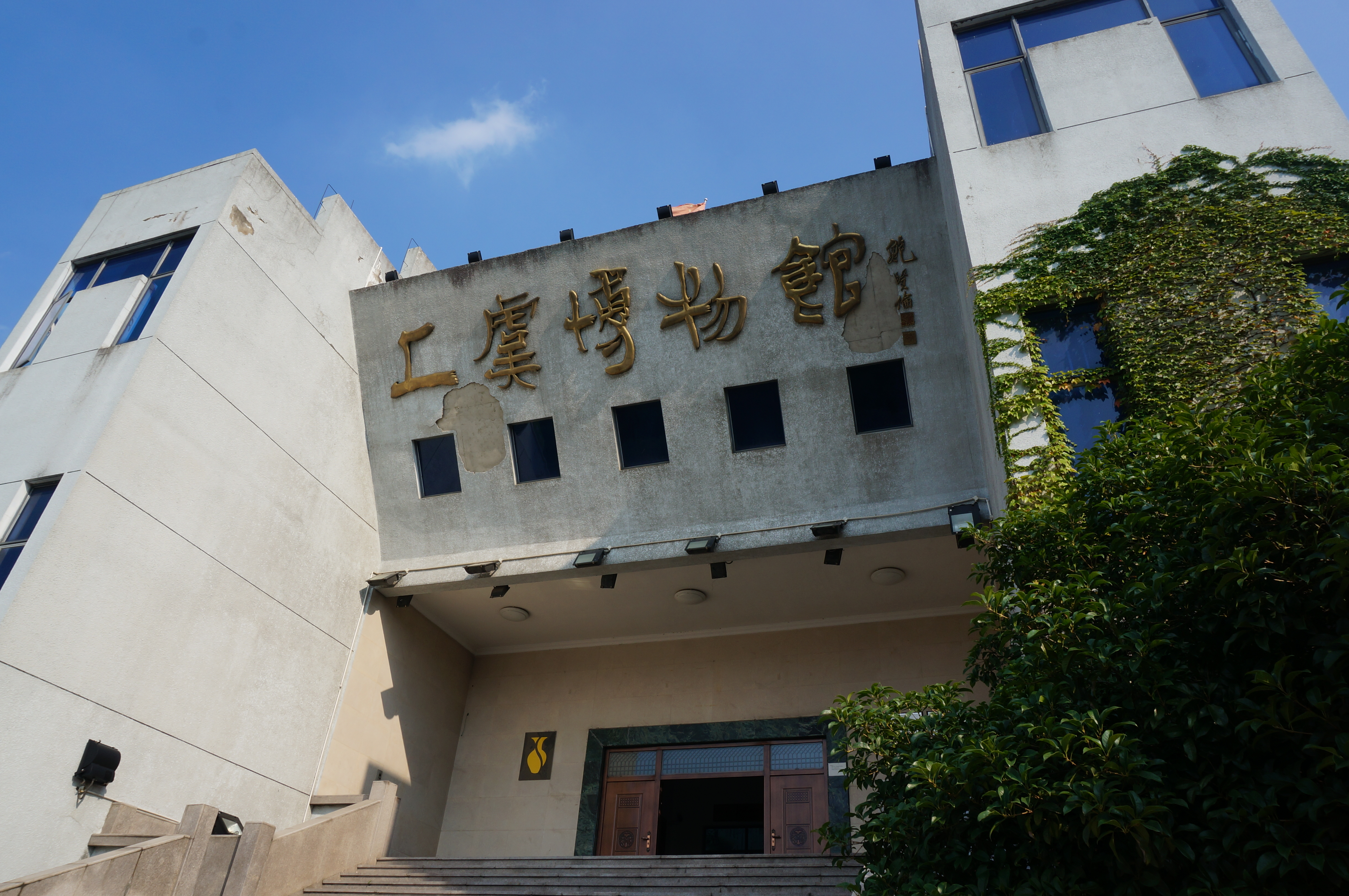
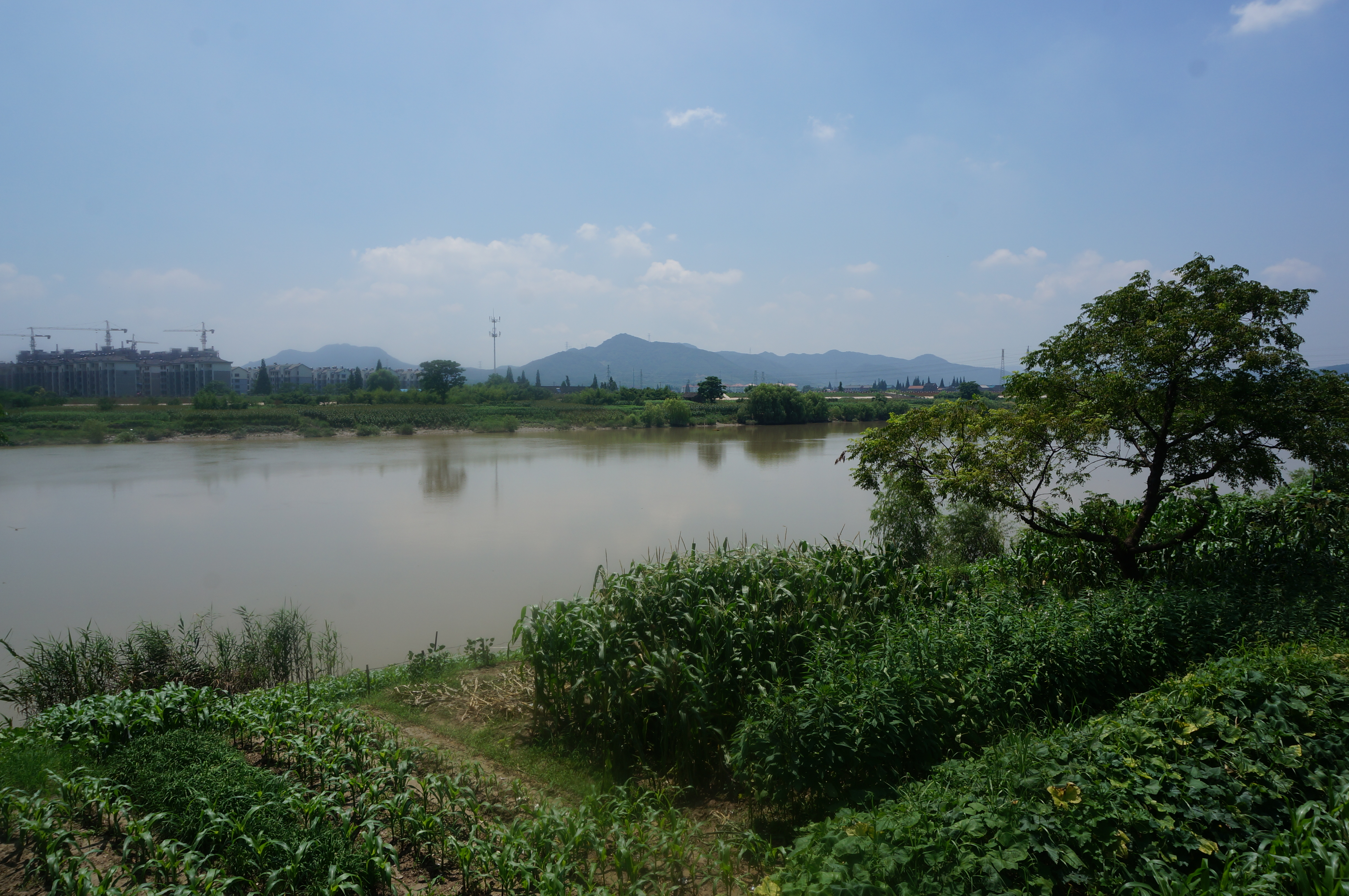
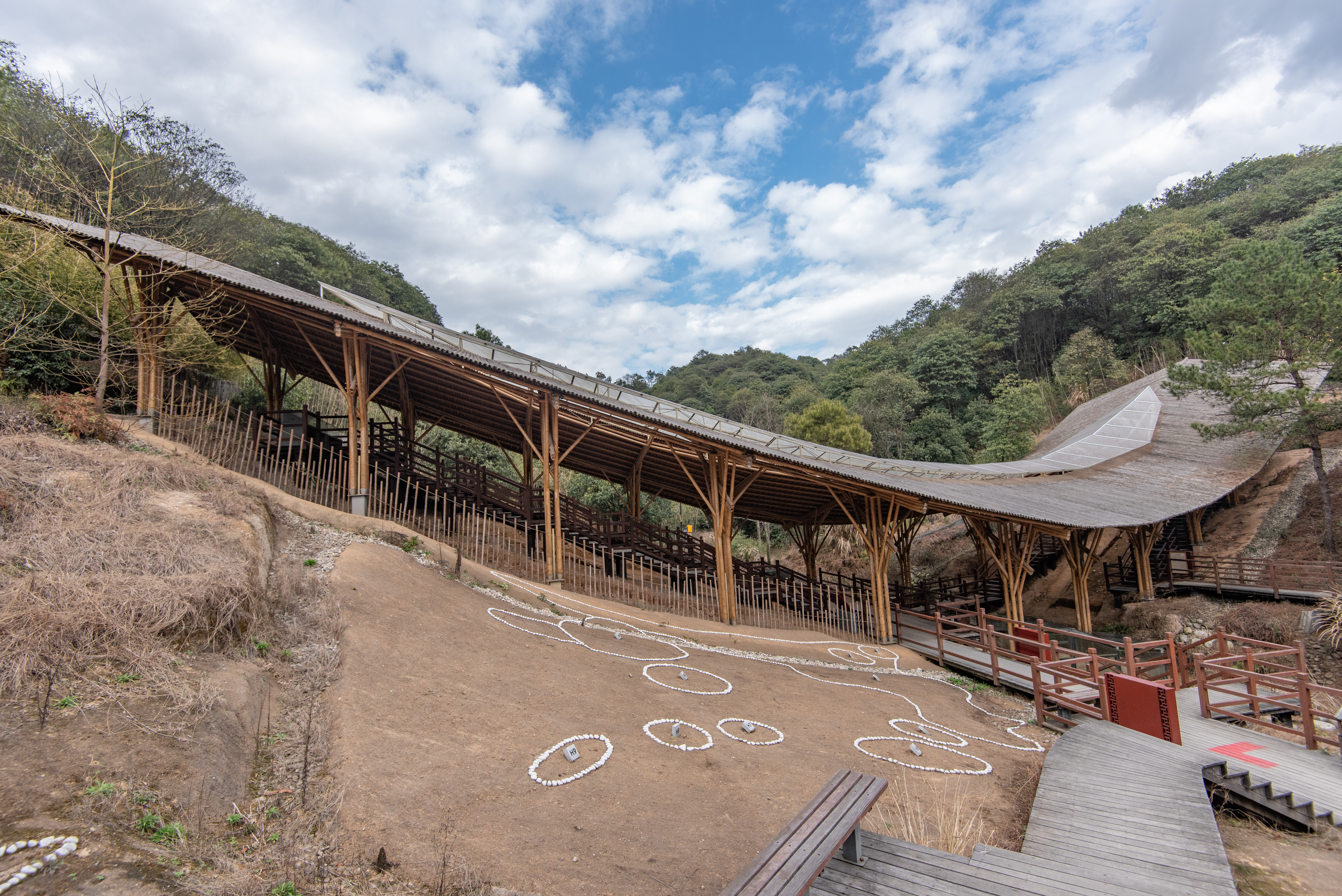
- Cao'e Temple Chunhui High School Site Downtown Shangyu Museum Cao'e River Fenghuangshan Kiln Sites Downtown Shangyu

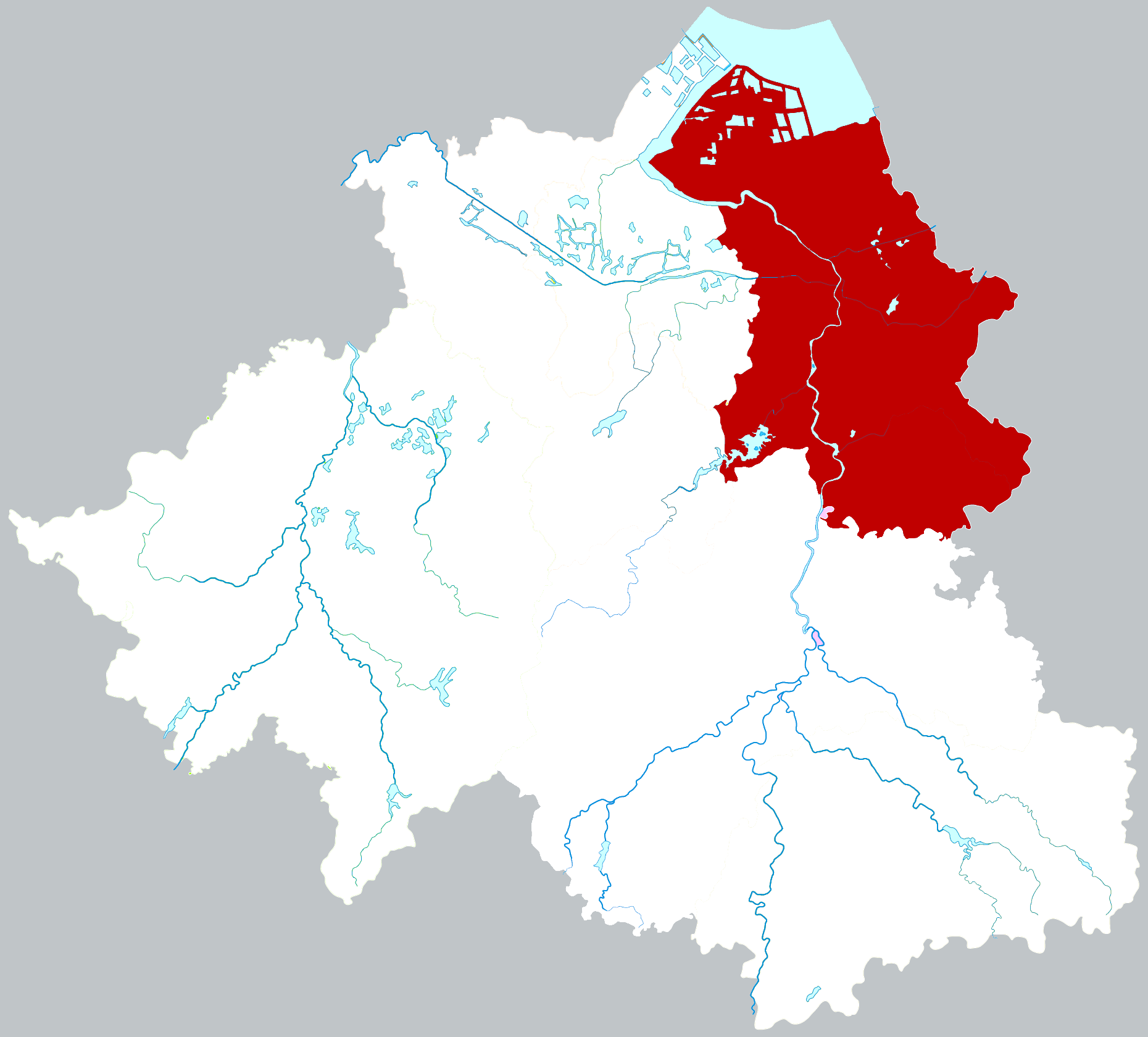
- Location of Shangyu District within Shaoxing

- Location in Zhejiang
- Coordinates: 30°01′N 120°52′E
- Country: People's Republic of China
- Province: Zhejiang
- Prefecture-level city: Shaoxing

Area
  - Total: 1,405.79 km^{2} (542.78 sq mi)

Population (2020)
  - Total: 839,747
  - Density: 597.349/km^{2} (1,547.13/sq mi)
- Time zone: UTC+8 (China Standard)

Shangyu District (Chinese: 上虞区; pinyin: Shàngyú) is a district of the prefecture-level city of Shaoxing in the northeast of Zhejiang province, China. At the 2010 census, its population in the built-up (or metro) area was 779,412, up from 722,523 in the 2000 census. Shangyu is roughly fifty kilometers from north to south and about thirty kilometers from east to west. It makes up about one-fourth of the area of Shaoxing prefecture. Shangyu District is not part of the Hangzhou-Shaoxing built-up area as some countryside still prevent the city from being conurbated until now.

The city is one of the largest production bases of umbrellas worldwide.

== Administrative divisions ==
Subdistricts:

- Baiguan Subdistrict (百官街道), Cao'e Subdistrict (曹娥街道), Dongguan Subdistrict (东关街道)

Towns:

- Daoxu (道墟镇), Shangpu (上浦镇), Tangpu (汤浦镇), Zhangzhen (章镇镇), Xiaguan (下管镇), Fenghui (丰惠镇), Yonghe (永和镇), Lianghu (梁湖镇), Yiting (驿亭镇), Songxia (崧厦镇), Lihai (沥海镇), Xiaoyue (小越镇), Xietang (谢塘镇), Changtang (长塘镇), Gaibei (盖北镇)

Townships:

- Lingnan Township (岭南乡), Chenxi Township (陈溪乡), Dingzhai Township (丁宅乡)

== Climate ==
Climate data for Shangyu, elevation 6 m (20 ft), (1991–2020 normals, extremes 1981–present)
Month	Jan	Feb	Mar	Apr	May	Jun	Jul	Aug	Sep	Oct	Nov	Dec	Year
Record high °C (°F)	24.3 (75.7)	29.7 (85.5)	34.7 (94.5)	34.3 (93.7)	37.0 (98.6)	38.3 (100.9)	40.6 (105.1)	40.2 (104.4)	39.2 (102.6)	35.8 (96.4)	31.6 (88.9)	24.6 (76.3)	40.6 (105.1)
Mean daily maximum °C (°F)	8.7 (47.7)	11.2 (52.2)	15.7 (60.3)	21.9 (71.4)	26.8 (80.2)	29.2 (84.6)	33.9 (93.0)	33.1 (91.6)	28.5 (83.3)	23.4 (74.1)	17.8 (64.0)	11.4 (52.5)	21.8 (71.2)
Daily mean °C (°F)	4.9 (40.8)	7.0 (44.6)	11.1 (52.0)	16.9 (62.4)	21.9 (71.4)	25.1 (77.2)	29.4 (84.9)	28.7 (83.7)	24.4 (75.9)	19.0 (66.2)	13.3 (55.9)	7.2 (45.0)	17.4 (63.3)
Mean daily minimum °C (°F)	2.2 (36.0)	3.9 (39.0)	7.5 (45.5)	12.8 (55.0)	18.1 (64.6)	22.0 (71.6)	25.8 (78.4)	25.4 (77.7)	21.3 (70.3)	15.5 (59.9)	9.9 (49.8)	4.0 (39.2)	14.0 (57.3)
Record low °C (°F)	−5.9 (21.4)	−7.9 (17.8)	−3.1 (26.4)	1.5 (34.7)	8.9 (48.0)	13.3 (55.9)	18.6 (65.5)	19.4 (66.9)	12.9 (55.2)	4.4 (39.9)	−1.8 (28.8)	−7.8 (18.0)	−7.9 (17.8)
Average precipitation mm (inches)	96.1 (3.78)	89.7 (3.53)	133.8 (5.27)	113.2 (4.46)	128.8 (5.07)	227.7 (8.96)	154.6 (6.09)	183.8 (7.24)	150.4 (5.92)	90.6 (3.57)	81.9 (3.22)	75.5 (2.97)	1,526.1 (60.08)
Average precipitation days (≥ 0.1 mm)	12.7	12.2	15.1	14.4	14.1	16.2	12.1	14.1	12.7	9.4	11.1	10.8	154.9
Average snowy days	3.2	2.0	0.6	0	0	0	0	0	0	0	0.1	1.2	7.1
Average relative humidity (%)	80	78	76	73	74	81	75	77	80	79	80	78	78
Mean monthly sunshine hours	96.6	101.1	121.2	148.0	156.8	126.9	217.1	198.2	148.3	140.5	112.1	110.0	1,676.8
Percentage possible sunshine	30	32	33	38	37	30	51	49	40	40	35	35	38
Source: China Meteorological Administration

== Baiguan ==
Shangyu's urban center, Baiguan, is located where the Cao'e River flows out of the hilly area that makes up more than half of the county, into flat alluvial land bordering Hangzhou Bay. This river, and the Cao E Temple (曹娥庙) next to it, are named after a fourteen-year-old girl who became famous in 143 AD for her filial devotion. She died in the river trying to retrieve the body of her father (Cao Xu) who drowned while officiating at a ceremony in honor of Wu Zixu who himself was famous for his filial piety.

Baiguan is about 28 km (17 mi) east of Shaoxing's urban center. The railroad from Hangzhou to Ningbo passes through Baiguan, and the new superhighway between Hangzhou and Ningbo skirts Baiguan. Within Shangyu, just northwest of Baiguan, the Hangzhou-Ningbo highway (mostly east–west) intersects with a superhighway that goes south to the seacoast and then down the coast, through Wenzhou and Fuzhou, all the way to Guangzhou.

In the name "Baiguan" (百官) "bai" means "hundred" and "guan" means an imperial civil service official. The city came to be called this when it became famous for producing many scholars who became officials by passing the imperial civil service examination.

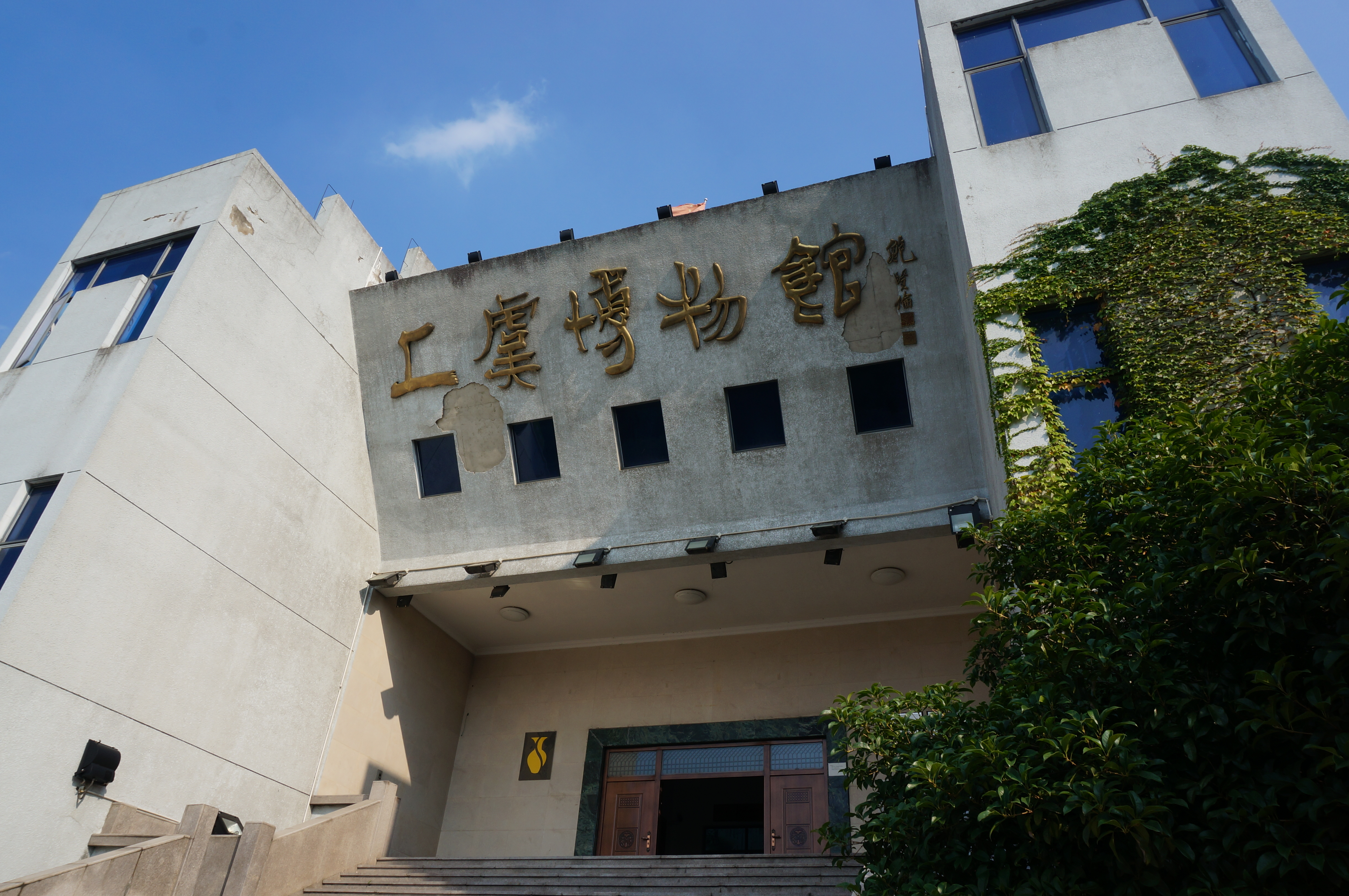
Shangyu Museum

== Culture ==
In the tragic legend of the Butterfly Lovers, the young lady was from Shangyu and the young gentleman was from Shaoxing.

Two books by Zhang Jinhuan (章金焕) published by the Zhejiang University Press deal with porcelain (mostly celadon) produced in the Cao'e River Valley in Shangyu starting in the Eastern Han dynasty: Shangyu Yue Kilns (上虞越窑) (2007) ISBN 978-7-308-05462-1, and Yue Porcelain Gems (越瓷瑰宝) (2009) ISBN 978-7-308-06531-3.

== Language ==
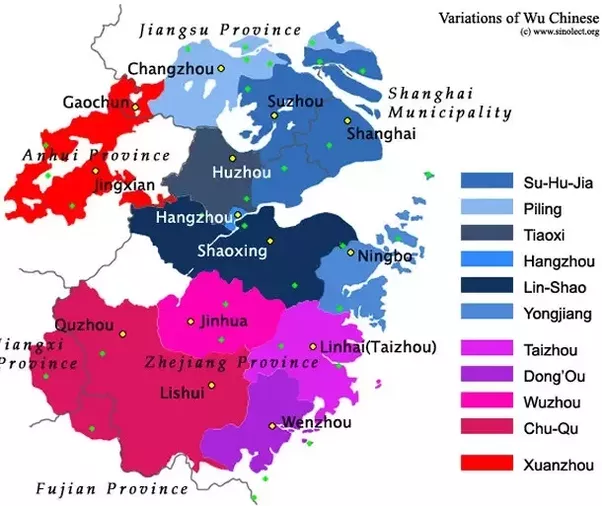
Distribution of Wu language

Wu language, also known as Jiang Nan, Wu Yue, Jiang Dong language. Three thousand years of history from the Zhou Dynasty. In China, Wu language are distributing in Zhejiang, southern part of Jiangsu, Shanghai, southern part of Anhui and Fujian province. The population who use this language is about ninety million.

People in Shangyu primarily use the Wu language for everyday communication. The language retains many ancient tones and words and has considerable research value for the study of the development of Chinese languages. It is also an expression of the ways of thinking and lifestyles of people living in the southern Yangtze River region. More than 100 cities, led by Shanghai, form the Wu city group and Jiangnan cultural circle, whose populations share similar cultural values and traditions of unity and mutual assistance. The Yangtze River Delta region has become one of the wealthiest areas in China, and Shangyu District is an important part of this region.

Putonghua (Standard mandarin) is the general language of China, it takes Beijing pronunciation as the standard pronunciation, northern dialect as the basic dialect. Shangyu is located in the south of China, so these two languages are very different, but to enhance communication among all ethnic groups and promote the cohesion of the Chinese nation, the government started popularizing Putonghua on a national scale from 2005. Therefore, people in Shangyu using Wu language as daily communication and using Putonghua in schools or travel to other places.

== Traditional food ==
Steamed pork with preserved vegetables (梅干菜扣肉)

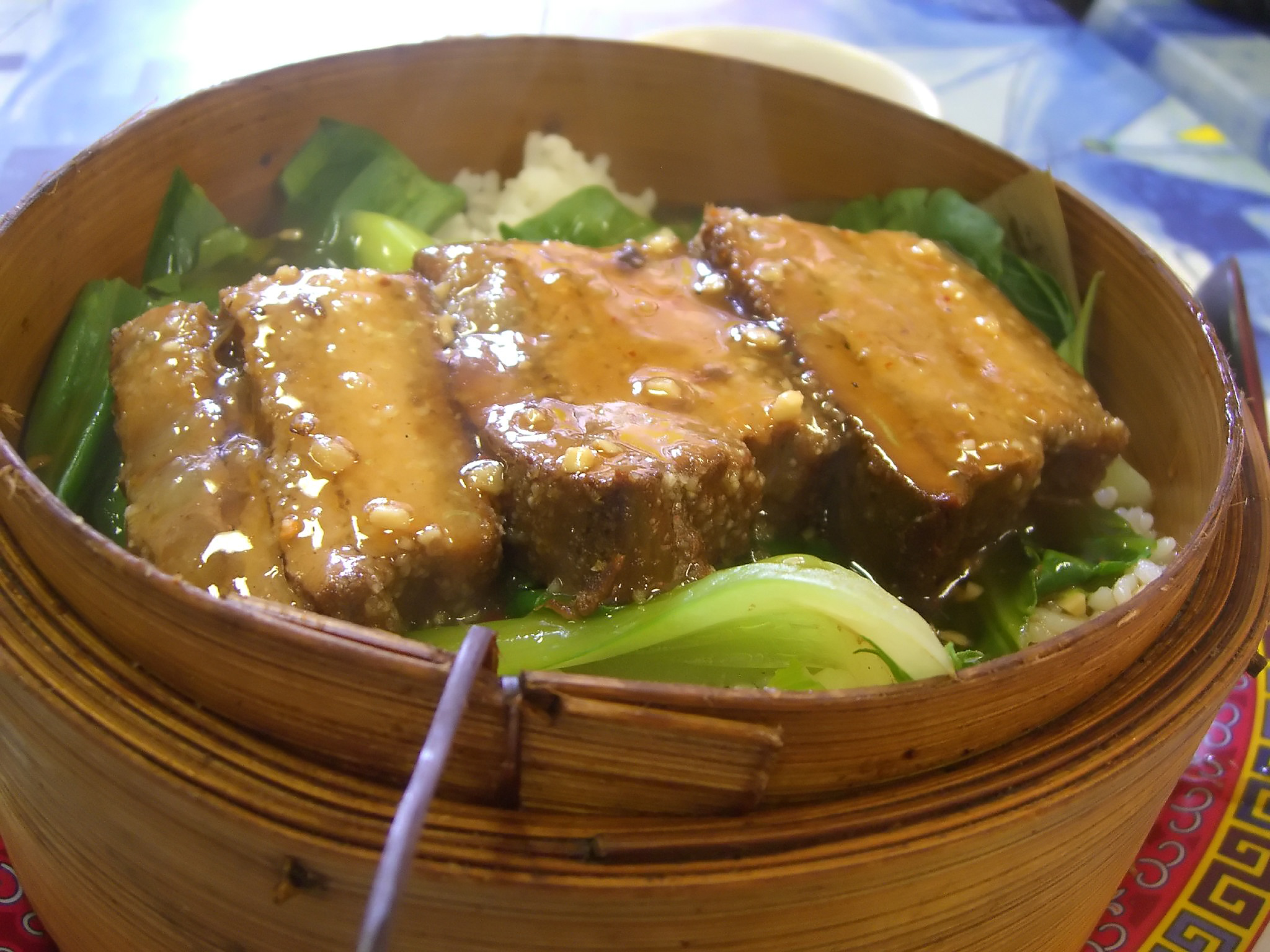
Steamed pork with preserved vegetables (梅干菜扣肉）

Cook pork firstly with star anise and soy sauce, then cover the pork with the pickled vegetables, finally steamed together in the specific pot. It tastes delicious but not greasy due to heavy fat, smooth and chewy. For the nutrition value, Pork have high quality protein and essential fatty acid, preserved vegetables have high concentration carotene and magnesium.

Fermented bean curd (腐乳)

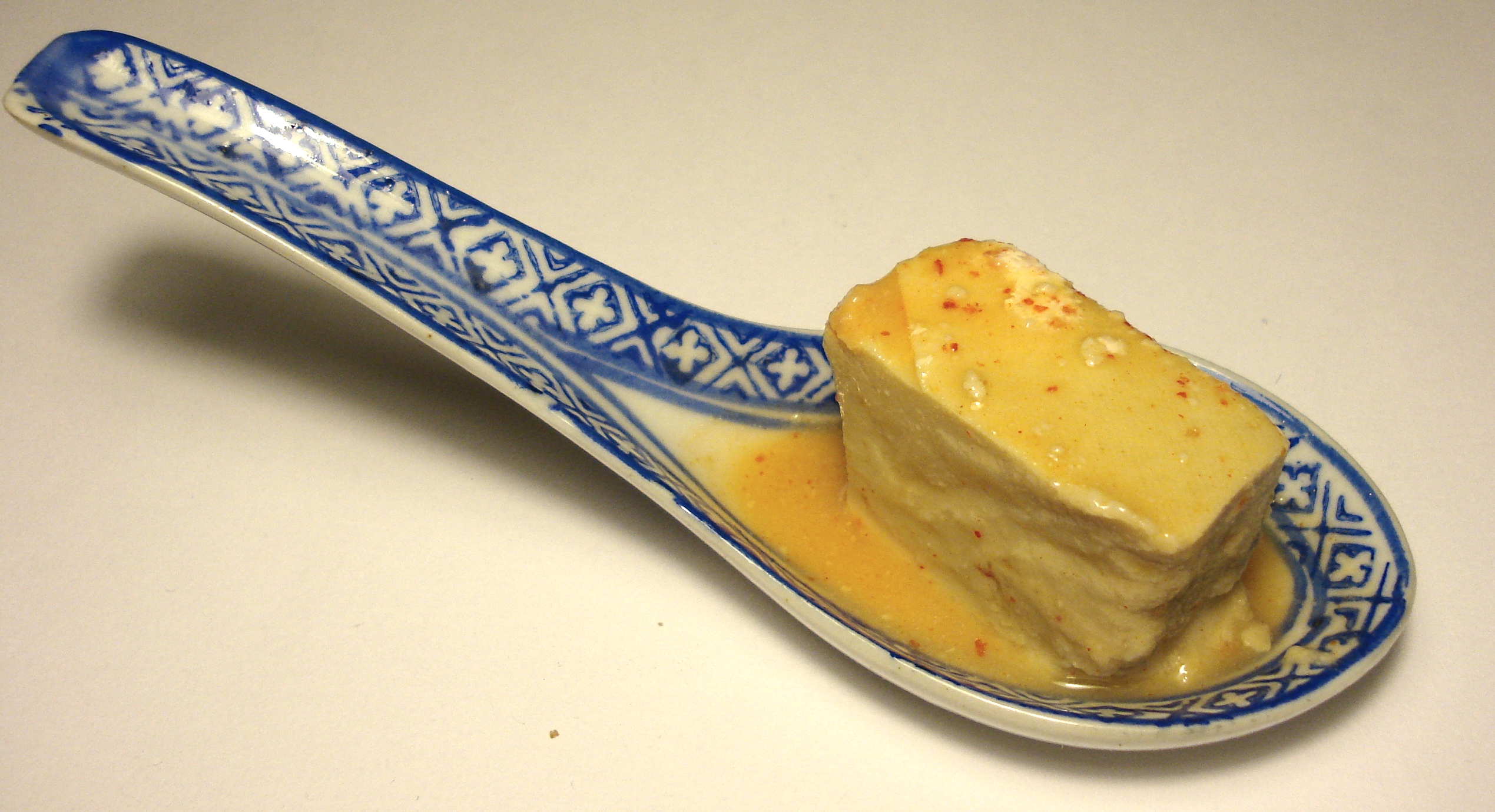
Fermented bean curd （腐乳）

It is a traditional folk food that has been spread for thousands of years in China. Because of its good taste, high nutrition and specific smell, the special flavor of eating is loved by the Chinese people. Fermented bean curd can be divides to three categories that are red, white and green. "Red hot", "Rose" and "Sweet spicy" are characteristics of fermented bean curd, which are only produced in Shangyu district. Bean curd make from beans and yellow wine. Because of its good taste, high nutrition and specific smell, the special flavor of eating is loved by the Chinese people. Fermented bean curd can be divides to three categories that are red, white and green.

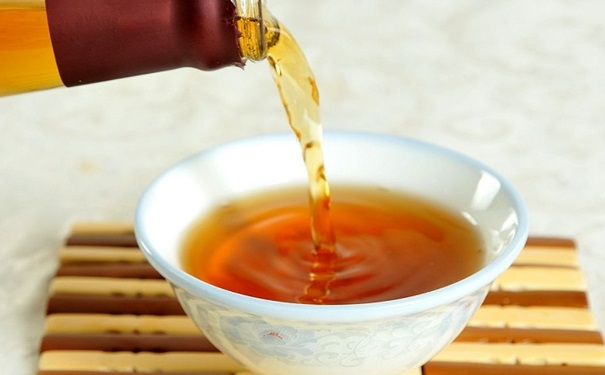
Yellow Rice Wine (黄酒）

It is connected to the local culture and childhood traditions of the Shangyu people and is commonly consumed as a breakfast food.

As for the cook methods, every family have different ways to do it depend on taste and mom's requirements

Yellow rice wine (黄酒)

Yellow rice wine used rice, millet as raw materials, the general alcohol content is 14% - 20%, belongs to low degree brewing wine. Yellow rice wine has high nutrition value, contains 21 kinds of amino acids, eight kinds of essential amino acids that the human can't synthesis must rely on food intake are all exist in yellow rice wine. "Marden red" is the most famous yellow rice wine in Shangyu, this kind of wine buried in the soil when girls born, after about 18 years, as present to husband on the wedding.

== Tourist attractions ==
Shangyu has a long history, with the name “Shangyu” appearing in oracle-bone inscriptions dating back approximately 3,000 years. The district contains traces of human activity from various historical periods. Southern Shangyu is predominantly mountainous and includes orchards and geological features associated with Quaternary glaciation.

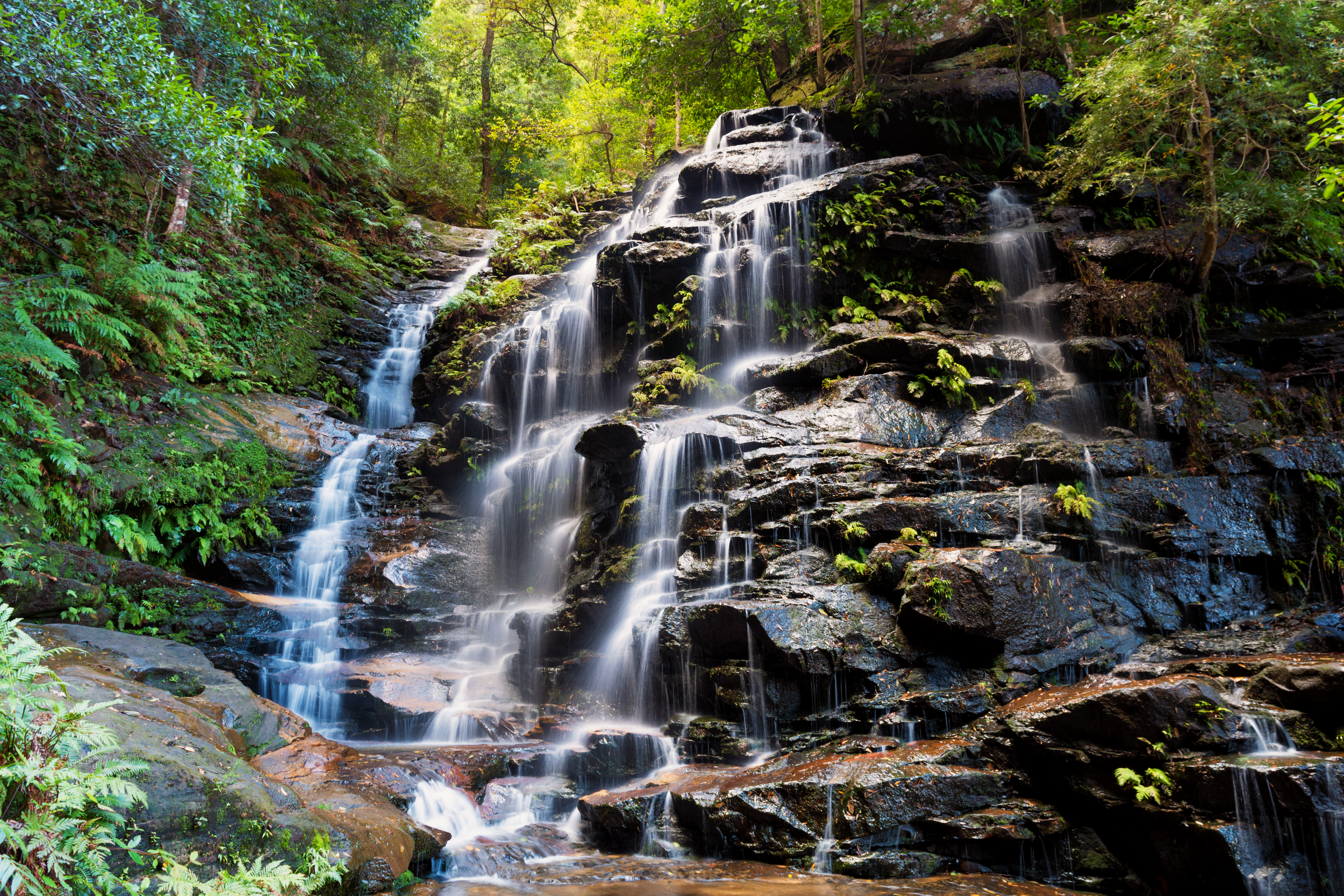
Fengming Mountain waterfalls

Fengming Mountain (凤鸣山)

Fengming Mountain is located in Fenghui, approximately 4 km (2.5 mi) from the town centre. The scenic area covers approximately 2.4 square kilometres. Its principal attractions include the Overhanging Rock and Waterfall and a vine believed to be around 1,000 years old. Taoist literature describes the mountain as the “ninth great sacred site”. It is associated with the alchemist and Taoist scholar Wei Boyang, who is traditionally believed to have been born and practised alchemy in the area. He is also credited with writing the Zhouyi Cantong Qi, a work concerning Chinese alchemy.

Gong Mountain (贡山)

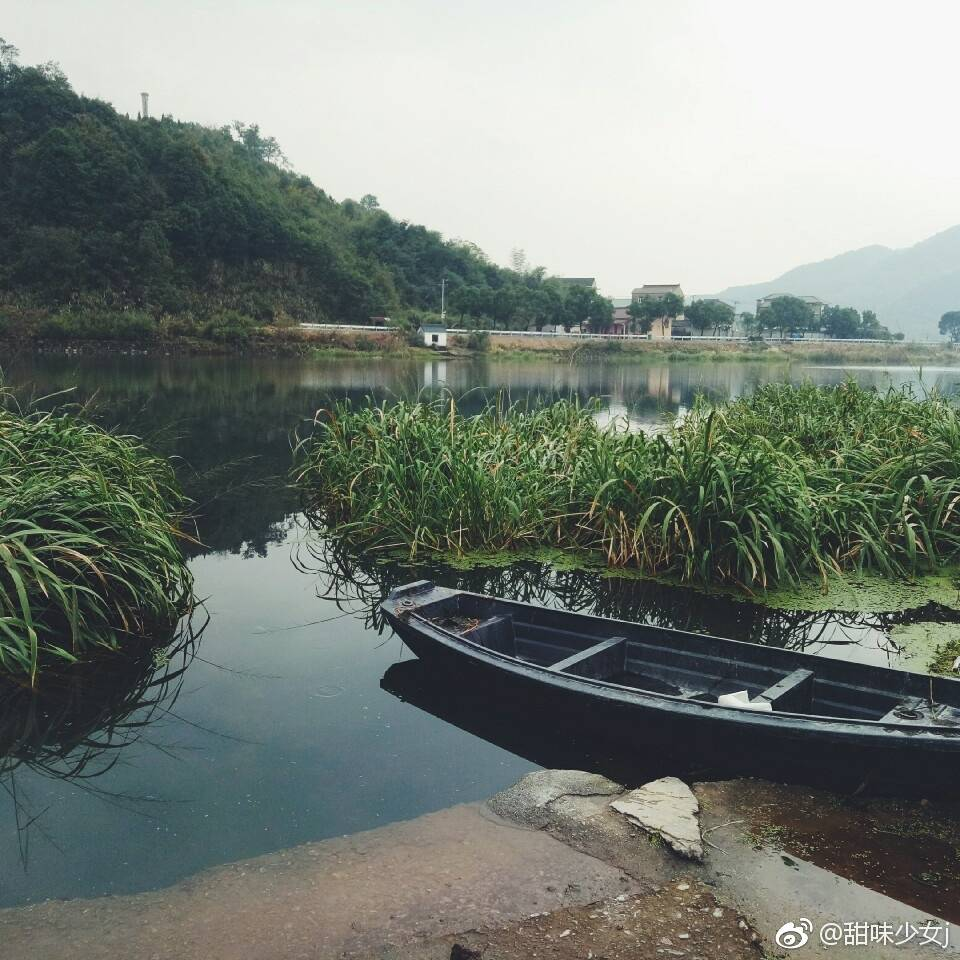
Countryside of Shangyu

Gong Mountain is located near Songxia and extends across Yi County, Xiuning County, and Huizhou District. It covers an area of approximately 1,078 square kilometres. The mountain is known for its sunrises, distinctive pine trees and rock formations, cloud formations, and hot springs. Its geological features are also considered relevant to the study of the development of regional geological structures.

The Famen Temple (罚宁寺)

Famen Temple, which is associated with a relic believed to be a finger bone of Gautama Buddha, is stated to be located in Shangyu, Zhejiang Province. The temple is said to have been established during the Eastern Han dynasty (25–220) as a centre for the dissemination of Buddhism. Its principal structures include the Famen Temple Pagoda and the Famen Temple Museum. Archaeological finds at the site reportedly include objects associated with imperial patronage of Buddhism. During the Sui and Tang dynasties, the temple served as an imperial temple. The relic was kept in an underground chamber beneath the temple.

The fourth stone glaciers

Glaciers of Fuzhi mountain (覆卮山冰川)

Fuzhi Mountain is located near the borders of Shangyu District and the county-level cities of Shengzhou and Yuyao. It has an elevation of 861.3 metres and is frequently covered by cloud and mist. The mountain also contains stone rivers extending down its slopes. These formations have been attributed to glacial activity during the Quaternary period.

Research has suggested that the area experienced substantial glacial activity during the early Quaternary period. The formations may therefore provide evidence for research into Quaternary geology and climatic and environmental change in East Asia. The stone rivers and terraces are also local tourist attractions.

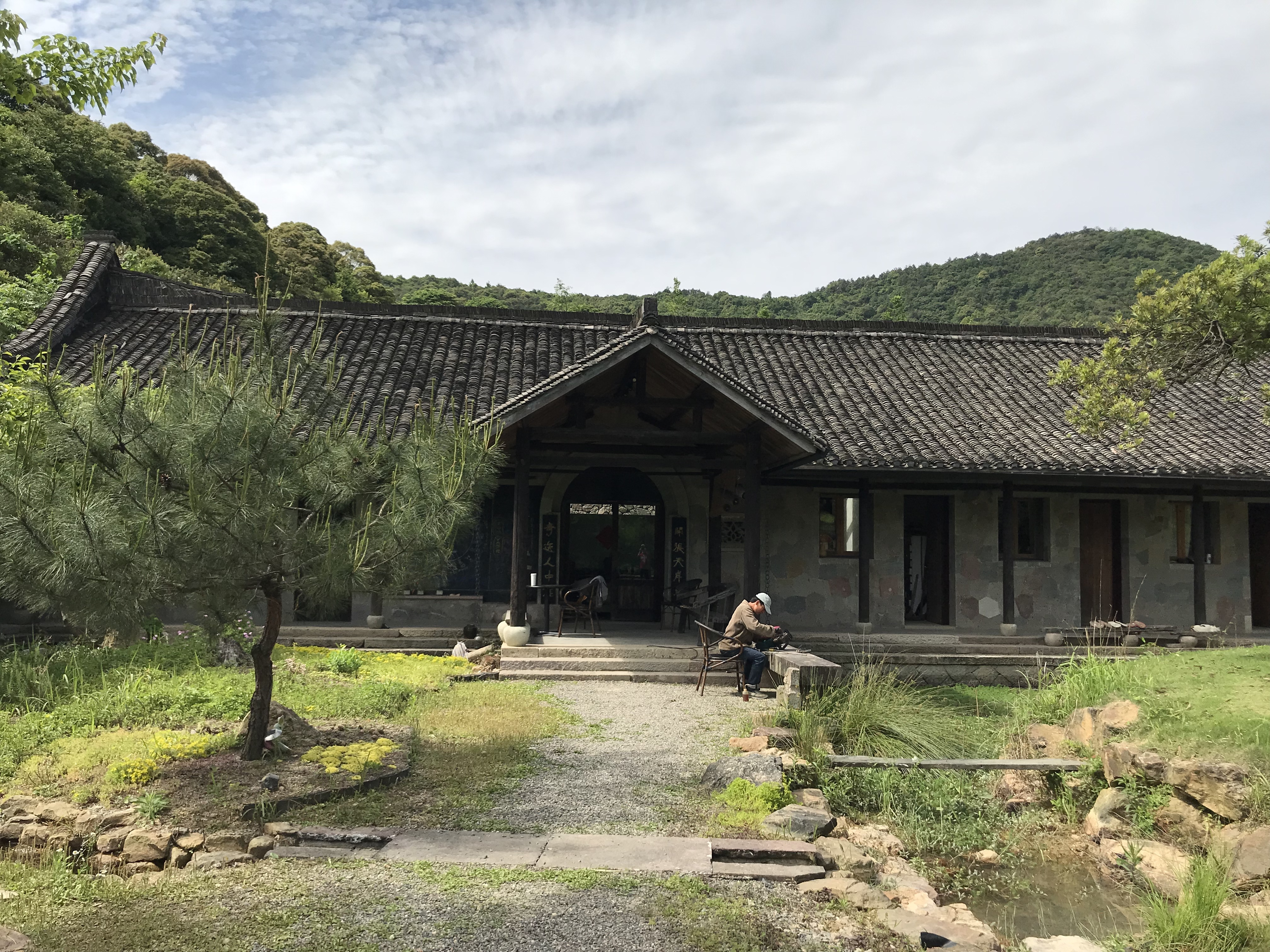
Villages picture of Shangyu

Nautical Flower Fields Of Hangzhou Bay (杭州湾海上花田)

The Nautical Flower Fields of Hangzhou Bay are located in the southern part of the Hangzhou Bay New Area. The attraction includes flower gardens, lakes, and artificial landmarks such as a windmill and a chapel. It combines landscaped open spaces with agricultural tourism activities. The site is divided into five functional zones, including an area known as the Colourful Pastoral Area. Other facilities include an agricultural exhibition hall, an ecological agriculture demonstration area, and the Ten-Mile Gallery.

== Economy ==
Shangyu is one of the largest production bases of umbrellas worldwide, producing 600 million umbrellas a year, one third of China's total umbrella production. Production is concentrated in Songxia Subdistrict, which is home to 1445 umbrella producing companies. Since 2018 the city hosts the yearly China Umbrella City Songxia Umbrella Expo.
