= Xinchang County =

Xinchang 新昌县 Sinchang
- County
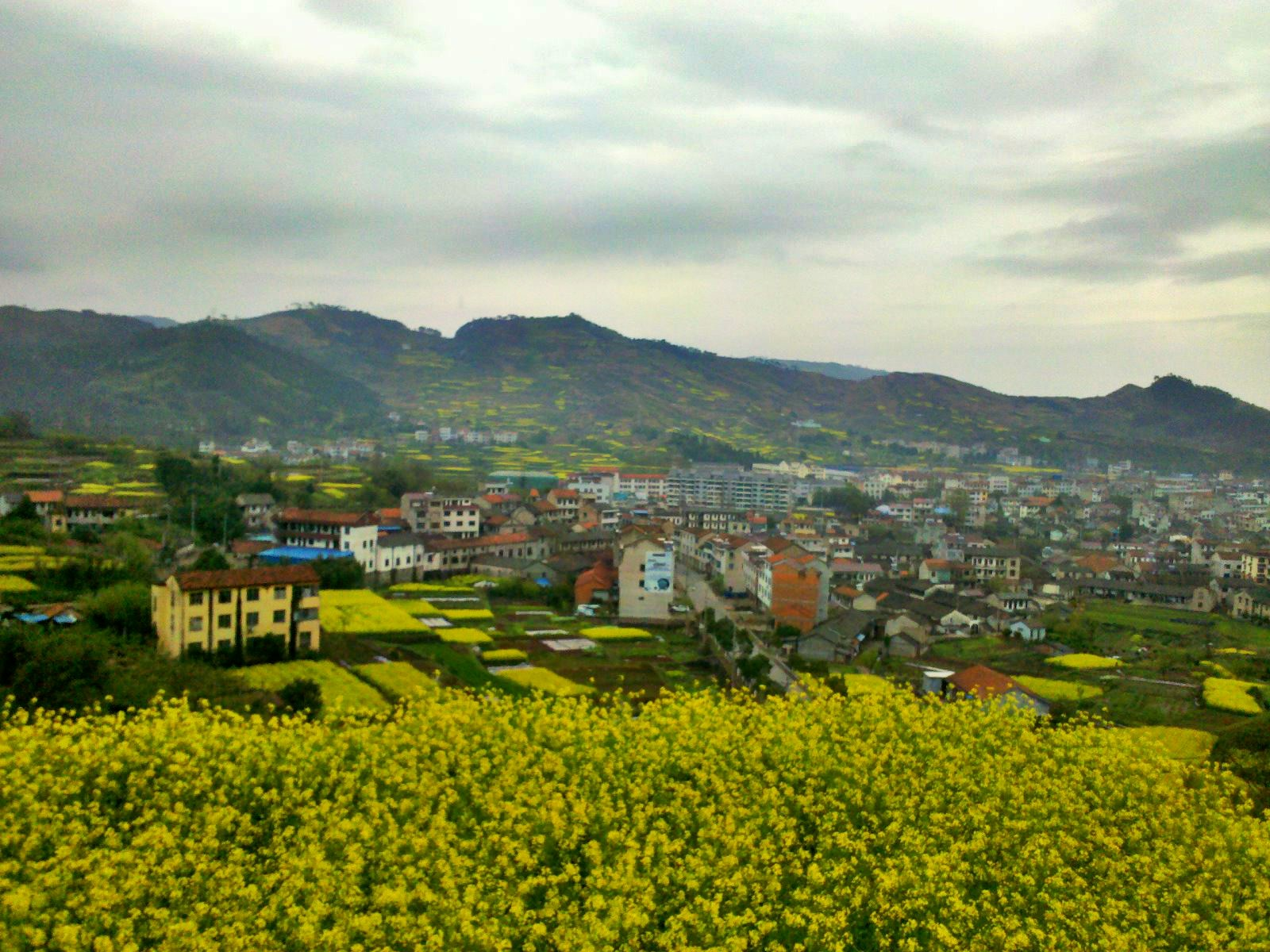

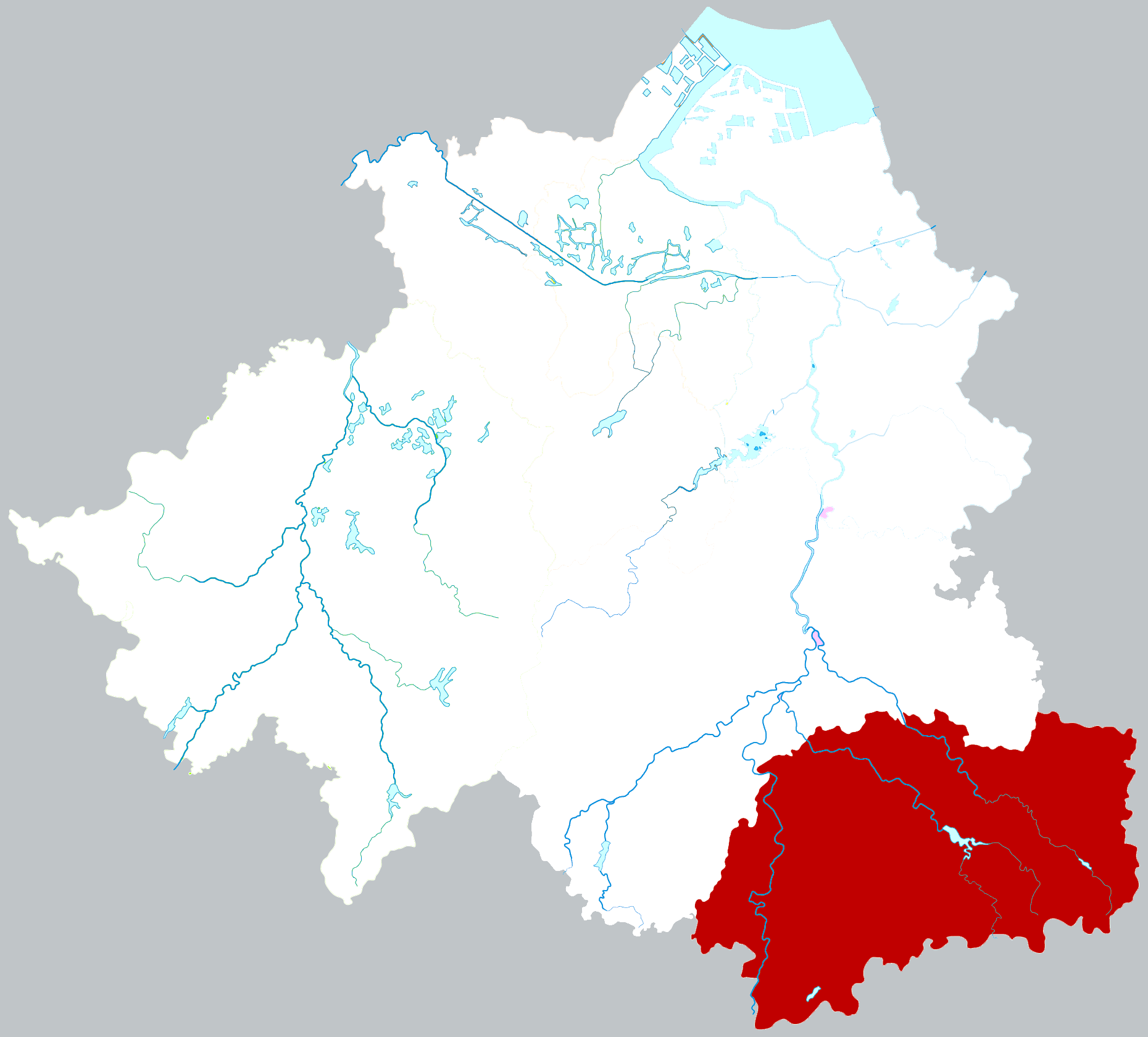
- Location of Xinchang County within Shaoxing

- Location of the seat in Zhejiang
- Coordinates: 29°29′59″N 120°54′14″E
- Country: People's Republic of China
- Province: Zhejiang
- Prefecture-level city: Shaoxing

Area
  - Total: 1,213.55 km^{2} (468.55 sq mi)

Population (2020)
  - Total: 419,036
  - Density: 345.298/km^{2} (894.317/sq mi)
- Time zone: UTC+8 (China Standard)

Xinchang County (simplified Chinese: 新昌县; traditional Chinese: 新昌縣; pinyin: Xīnchāng Xiàn) is a county in the east-central part of Zhejiang province, administratively under the municipal government of Shaoxing. 419,000 people live in Xinchang as of 2020.

== Administrative divisions ==
Subdistricts:

- Yulin Subdistrict (羽林街道), Nanming Subdistrict (南明街道), Qixing Subdistrict (七星街道)

Towns:

- Shaxi (沙溪镇；沙溪鎭), Ru'ao (儒岙镇；儒嶴鎭), Huishan (回山镇；回山鎭), Chengtan (澄潭镇；澄潭鎭), Xiaojiang (小将镇；小將鎭), Jingling (镜岭镇；鏡嶺鎭), Meizhu (梅渚镇；梅渚鎭), Dashiju (大市聚镇；大市聚鎭)

Townships:

- Shuangcai Township (双彩乡；雙彩鄉), Qiaoying Township (巧英乡；巧英鄉), Dongming Township (东茗乡；東茗鄉), Xinlin Township (新林乡；新林鄉), Chengnan Township (城南乡；城南鄉)

== Climate ==
Climate data for Xinchang, elevation 115 m (377 ft), (1991–2020 normals, extremes 1981–present)
Month	Jan	Feb	Mar	Apr	May	Jun	Jul	Aug	Sep	Oct	Nov	Dec	Year
Record high °C (°F)	25.3 (77.5)	29.5 (85.1)	34.7 (94.5)	35.0 (95.0)	37.0 (98.6)	38.3 (100.9)	41.8 (107.2)	44.1 (111.4)	40.3 (104.5)	35.7 (96.3)	32.5 (90.5)	27.0 (80.6)	44.1 (111.4)
Mean daily maximum °C (°F)	9.5 (49.1)	12.3 (54.1)	16.7 (62.1)	22.9 (73.2)	27.2 (81.0)	29.6 (85.3)	34.5 (94.1)	33.7 (92.7)	28.8 (83.8)	23.9 (75.0)	18.3 (64.9)	12.0 (53.6)	22.5 (72.4)
Daily mean °C (°F)	5.0 (41.0)	7.1 (44.8)	11.1 (52.0)	16.8 (62.2)	21.5 (70.7)	24.7 (76.5)	29.0 (84.2)	28.2 (82.8)	23.9 (75.0)	18.6 (65.5)	13.1 (55.6)	7.1 (44.8)	17.2 (62.9)
Mean daily minimum °C (°F)	1.8 (35.2)	3.5 (38.3)	7.1 (44.8)	12.1 (53.8)	17.1 (62.8)	21.2 (70.2)	24.8 (76.6)	24.4 (75.9)	20.5 (68.9)	14.8 (58.6)	9.4 (48.9)	3.5 (38.3)	13.4 (56.0)
Record low °C (°F)	−7.5 (18.5)	−6.4 (20.5)	−3.8 (25.2)	0.3 (32.5)	7.2 (45.0)	11.2 (52.2)	17.5 (63.5)	17.8 (64.0)	11.5 (52.7)	2.2 (36.0)	−3.5 (25.7)	−11.6 (11.1)	−11.6 (11.1)
Average precipitation mm (inches)	74.9 (2.95)	75.7 (2.98)	128.7 (5.07)	118.8 (4.68)	136.6 (5.38)	250.2 (9.85)	128.0 (5.04)	194.7 (7.67)	122.2 (4.81)	63.5 (2.50)	67.2 (2.65)	62.2 (2.45)	1,422.7 (56.03)
Average precipitation days (≥ 0.1 mm)	12.9	12.6	15.9	14.7	14.9	17.3	12.0	15.0	12.8	8.0	10.7	10.6	157.4
Average snowy days	3.9	2.5	0.6	0	0	0	0	0	0	0	0.1	1.4	8.5
Average relative humidity (%)	77	75	74	72	74	80	74	77	80	77	78	75	76
Mean monthly sunshine hours	101.7	105.3	123.5	151.2	164.2	134.4	232.3	208.8	154.0	153.9	119.5	118.6	1,767.4
Percentage possible sunshine	31	33	33	39	39	32	54	51	42	44	38	37	39
Source: China Meteorological Administration all-time extreme temperature

== Toxic capsule town ==
The town of Ru'ao (儒岙) became synonymous with poison. The factories using industrial gelatin to make pills were closed soon after CCTV reported the scandal on April 15, 2012. A third of Ruao's 30,000 population is employed in the capsule industry.

== Tourism ==
Xinchang is home to the Dafo Temple (大佛寺).
