= Handan Chun =

Chinese writer of the Three Kingdoms period

Handan Chun (Chinese: 邯鄲淳), courtesy name Zishu (Chinese: 子叔) or Zili (Chinese: 子禮), also known as Handan Zhu (Chinese: 邯鄲竺), was a writer, calligrapher, and official from Yingchuan Commandery (modern day Yuzhou, Henan) who served the state of Cao Wei during the early 3rd century. As a calligrapher, he was an expert in many types of scripts and was one of the first scholars to study the Shuowen Jiezi. He is credited with restoring the archaic tadpole script tradition. His most famous work is the Xiaolin (笑林), a collection of humorous anecdotes.

== Life ==
The Shui Jing Zhu records that Handan Chun was a nephew of Du Shang, and accompanied him when he became county magistrate in Kuaiji. In 151 Du Shang wanted to set up a stele commemorating Cao E, a girl who died trying to save her father from drowning eight years before. The Kuaiji dianlu, quoted in the Book of Later Han's commentary, records the following story: Du Shang first commissioned Wei Lang to write the inscription. When Du Shang asked if Wei Lang had completed the inscription at a drinking banquet, Wei Lang responded negatively and apologized for his lack of skill. Du Shang then promptly asked Handan, who was also at the banquet, to write the inscription. Handan quickly composed it without revising. The result was so good that Wei Lang destroyed his own draft. Handan, in this account, is described as being "just twenty years old, but has extraordinary talent." According to this record, Handan was probably born sometime around 130.

In early 190, Handan had a position in the court in Chang'an, but due to the turmoil in North China, he fled to Jing province the next year, serving in the staff of Liu Biao, which became an important literary salon. In 199, he wrote the funerary stele for the official Chen Ji, who died the same year. At the time, Chen Ji was an important figure, so the choice to make Handan his funerary inscription's composer could imply that he had already established himself as a famous scholar.

In 208, Handan accepted an invitation to join the court of Cao Cao in Ye (modern-day Linzhang County, Hebei). In 211, he became a literary scholar in the court of Cao Pi. When Cao Zhi requested for Handan to come to his court, Cao Cao obliged, and in 216 Handan arrived in Cao Zhi's court in Linzi. The Weilüe, quoted in Pei Songzhi's commentary on the Records of the Three Kingdoms, records the following story: When Handan Chun first arrived, Cao Zhi did not talk to him. The day was very hot, so Cao Zhi ordered his attendants to bring water for bathing. After bathing, they put powder on their faces, and sat bare-headed and bare-chested, watching various performances, including the "Dance of the Five Hammers", juggling of balls, the performance of swords, and performances of jesters. Only after the performances did Cao Zhi address Handan, saying "Scholar Handan, how are you?" Cao Zhi then changed clothes and started conversing with Handan Chun on topics such as the beginning of the universe and the "evaluation of men since the time of Fuxi". They also recited ancient and modern texts and discussed military strategies. After their conversations, Cao Zhi prepared a feast, after which Handan Chun returned home praising Cao Zhi, calling him a "heavenly man".

In 217, Handan was appointed literary scholar in Cao Zhi's court. When Cao Cao was considering which of his sons would be named heir, Handan Chun recommended Cao Zhi, which Cao Pi resented. Rafe de Crespigny holds the opinion that this is the reason why Cao Pi did not rank Handan Chun as one of the Seven Masters of Jian'an. Cao Pi later gave Handan Chun the position of erudite supervising secretary (博士給事中) in the Cao Wei court. When Handan wrote the Touhu fu (投壺賦), a fu on the traditional East Asian game of touhu, or pitch-pot, Cao Pi was so impressed that he gave him a thousand bolts of silk. The compiler of the Weilüe, Yu Huan, named Handan as one of the seven Confucian Exemplars (儒宗).

== Identity ==
Little information on Handan Chun is found in the historical records, and sometimes they appear contradictory. Different courtesy names are recorded for Handan. The Weilüe, quoted in Pei Songzhi's commentary on Records of the Three Kingdoms, states that Handan Chun's courtesy name was Zishu (子叔), but the Kuaiji dianlu and the Shui Jing Zhu state that his courtesy name was Zili (子禮). Because of this, scholars such as Gu Huaisan have speculated that there could have been two people named Handan Chun.

Shen Yucheng and Shi Xuancong argue that the Handan Chun who wrote the Cao E stele was different from the one who wrote the Xiaolin. They argue that if the anecdote recorded in the Kuaiji dianlu is true, and that the same person went on to write the Xiaolin, then Handan Chun would have been in his nineties when he would be writing it.

There is also a discrepancy in the records on Handan Chun's ancestral home. It is generally accepted that Handan Chun came from Yingchuan Commandery, but the Book of Wei and the History of the Northern Dynasties state that he came from Chenliu Commandery.

== Calligraphy ==
According to the Weilüe, Handan Chun was an expert in many types of scripts, including bird-worm seal script, and in the Shuowen Jiezi.

The Siti shushi (四體書勢), quoted in Pei Songzhi's commentary on Records of the Three Kingdoms, records that Handan taught the classics in the tadpole script. It then states that his style of calligraphy was imitated by Wei Ji so well that he could not distinguish his own copy of the Book of Documents from Wei Ji's. Then, it states that during the reign of Cao Fang, scholars attempted to recreate Handan Chun's tadpole script to make a stone stele inscribed with the classics in three different scripts. However, Handan's calligraphy was lost by that time, so the scholars created a new tadpole script, which was made to resemble tadpoles to match the script name.

According to Hu Zhao's biography in Records of the Three Kingdoms, Handan Chun's calligraphy was widely emulated by others, alongside those of Hu, Zhong Yao, Wei Ji (卫觊), (Note: father of Wei Guan) and Wei Dan (Note: brother of Wei Kang) (韦诞).

== Works ==
Handan Chun's works include Xiaolin (笑林), a collection of jokes and folk humor; "Zeng Wu Chuxuan shi" (贈吳處玄詩), also called "Dazengshi" (答贈詩), a farewell poem about him leaving Linzi to go to Luoyang; "Shang shouming shubiao" (上受命述表), which announces his other composition, "Shouming shu" (受命述), a poem praising the new Cao Wei dynasty, and "Touhu fu" (投壺賦), a fu on the traditional East Asian game of touhu.

=== Xiaolin ===
Handan Chun's most famous work is the Xiaolin (笑林), a collection of humorous anecdotes. It is considered by scholars to be the first collection of jokes in Chinese literature, and the earliest zhiren xiaoshuo (志人小説, "records of personalities"). It was recorded for the first time in the Book of Sui, where it is attributed to Handan and records it as consisting of three juan (scrolls). The Old History of the Five Dynasties and New History of the Five Dynasties also record it as three juan. It is not mentioned in any other official dynastic history after this point. During the Southern Song, Wu Zeng recorded in the Nenggaizhai manlu (能改斋漫录) that the imperial palace had a ten-juan copy of the Old Xiaolin (古笑林). Wang Liqi states that this text was probably an expanded edition of Xiaolin. The book was lost after the Song dynasty, with the individual stories scattered in various collections. The first person to collect the various surviving stories of the Xiaolin was Ming dynasty scholar Chen Yumo, who collected 10 surviving fragments in his Guanghuaji (廣滑稽). Qing dynasty scholar Ma Guohan collected 26 fragments in the Yuhan shanfang jiyi shu (玉函山房輯佚書). Lu Xun then edited the most complete collection of stories in the Xiaolin so far in his Guxiaoshuo gouchen (古小說鉤沉), basing it on Ma Guohan's collection as well as adding three stories he found himself for a total of 29 stories.

=== "Zeng Wu Chuxuan shi" ===
The "Zeng Wu Chuxuan shi" (贈吳處玄詩) was a farewell poem that Handan wrote upon leaving Linzi for the Cao Wei court in Luoyang, where he took on the position of erudite supervising secretary (博士給事中) in 220. It was written in return to a poem written by Wu Chuxuan (吳處玄), who was probably also an attendant in Cao Zhi's court, but there are no mentions of him otherwise. The poem is also a source of historical information, confirming the accuracy of the Weilüe's records on Handan Chun's life.

=== "Touhu fu" ===
The "Touhu fu" (投壺賦) was a fu written by Handan Chun in 220. It describes in detail the game of touhu, which was becoming popular at the time with the educated elite. The Weilüe records that Handan wrote the poem, which consisted of over a thousand characters, in 220 and presented it to Cao Pi, who liked it and rewarded him with a thousands bolts of silk. The poem is preserved in the Yiwen leiju, with only 389 characters remaining.
