= Zhiguai =

Zhiguai (Chinese: 志怪; pinyin: zhìguài; Wade–Giles: Chih-kuai), the Chinese term for "tales of anomalies"; "supernatural stories", etc. may refer to:

- Zhiguai xiaoshuo, a Chinese literary genre
- Zu Taizhi zhiguai, a work by Zu Taizhi
