= Cao'e Stele =

Stele made for Cao E

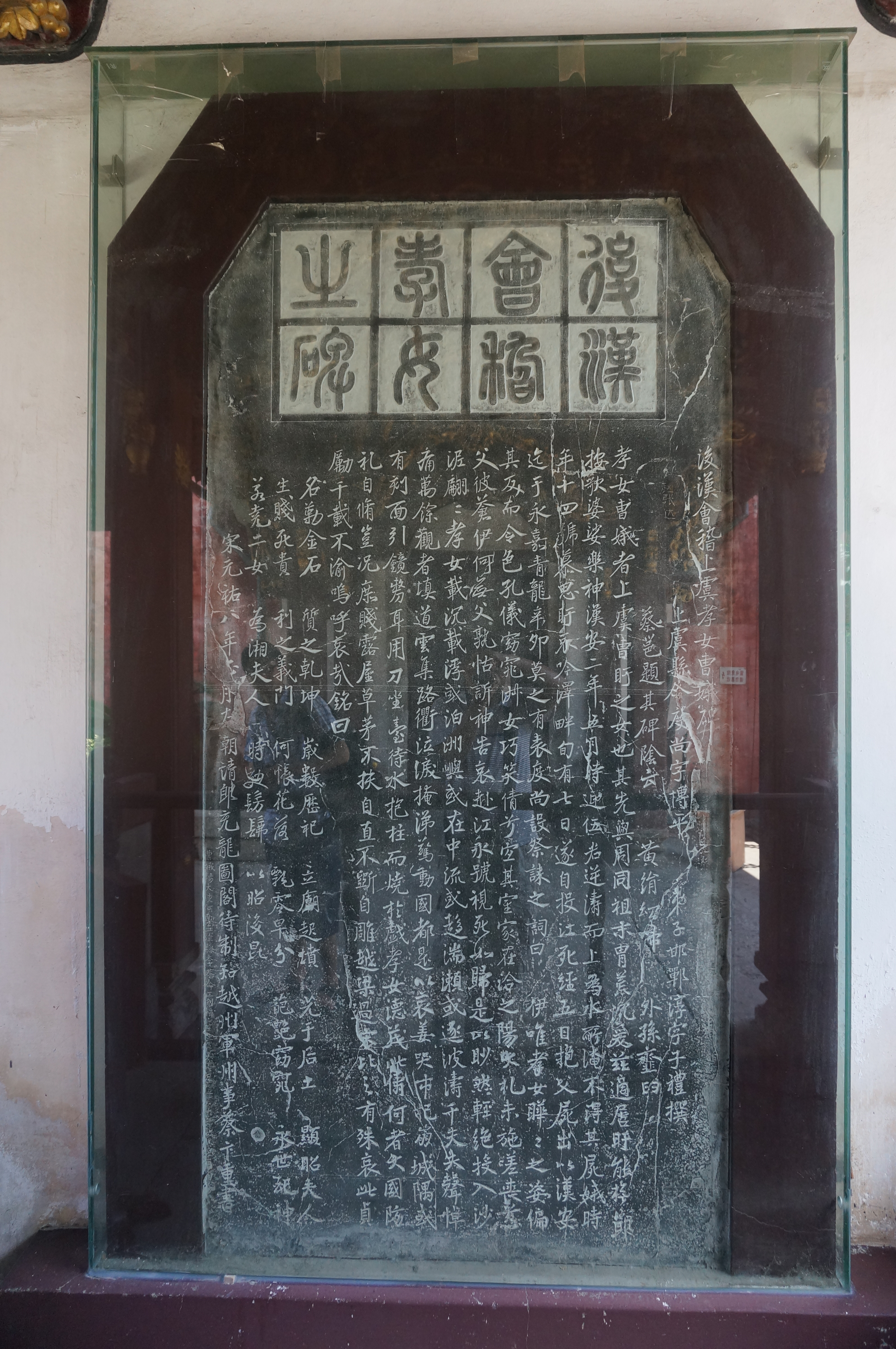
Cao'e Stele from the year 1093, made by Cai Bian (蔡卞). The monument is 2.1 meters high and 1 meter wide

During the Eastern Han dynasty in 143 AD, Cao E drowned at the age of 13 in the Shun River while trying to save her father from drowning. In the year 151, a temple and a stele was made for her to honor Cao E. The original stele was lost over time but in the year 1093 (Northern Song dynasty), Cai Bian (蔡卞) made a replacement stele. This stele is 2.1 metres high and 1 metre wide and is entitled: "The stele of Cao E, the filial piety daughter" and has become a historical monument. The stele is placed in the Cao'e Temple in the Shangyu District, Shaoxing in the northeast of Zhejiang Province in China.

The stele's text was commissioned by Du Shang. It was written by Handan Chun after Wei Lang failed complete it.
