= Wei Guan =

Jin Dynasty general and official (220-291)

- 衛瓘

Manager of the Affairs of the Masters of Writing (錄尚書事)
- In office late April 291 – 25 July 291
- Monarch: Emperor Hui of Jin

Grand Protector (太保)
- In office 5 February 290 – 25 July 291
- Monarch: Emperor Wu of Jin / Emperor Hui of Jin

Crown Prince's Junior Tutor (太子少傅)
- In office ?– 290

Minister of Works (司空)
- In office 283– 5 February 290

Palace Attendant (侍中)
- In office 278–290

Prefect of the Masters of Writing (尚書令)
- In office 278–290

Colonel of the Wuhuan (烏桓校尉)
- In office 271–278

Inspector of You Province (幽州刺史)
- In office 271–278

Senior General Who Attacks the North (征北大將軍)
- In office 271–278

Governor of Qing Province (青州牧)
- In office 269–271

Senior General Who Attacks the East (征東大將軍)
- In office 269–271

General Who Attacks the East (征東將軍)
- In office February 266–269
- Monarch: Emperor Wu of Jin

Personal details
- Born: 220 Xia County, Shanxi
- Died: July 291 (aged 71)
- Relations: Wei Shuo (granddaughter)
- Children: Wei Heng; Wei Yue; Wei Yi; Wei Xuan; Pei Kai's son-in-law; one daughter
- Parent: Wei Ji (father)
- Occupation: Military general, politician
- Courtesy name: Boyu (伯玉)
- Posthumous name: Cheng (成)
- Peerage: Duke of Lanling (蘭陵公)

Wei Guan (220 – 25 July 291 (Note: Although the exact day of Wei Guan's death was not recorded, Emperor Hui's biography in Book of Jin recorded that Wei was killed together with Sima Liang, who died on 25 July 291. Vol.82 of Zizhi Tongjian did not explicitly record when Sima Liang and Wei Guan were killed, but it did record that they were killed in the 6th month of that year, before the yichou day when Sima Wei was executed. The month starts from 14 July 291 in the Julian calendar, while the yichou day corresponds to 26 July.)), courtesy name Boyu, was a Chinese military general and politician of the state of Cao Wei during the Three Kingdoms period of China. He served under the Jin dynasty after the end of the Three Kingdoms period.

== Early life and career ==
Wei Guan was from Anyi County (安邑縣), Hedong Commandery (河東郡), which is located west of present-day Xia County, Shanxi. His father Wei Ji (衛覬; 168 - 229) was a high-ranking Wei official and marquis. (Note: Wei Ji was also a master calligrapher, and has a biography in vol.21 of Records of the Three Kingdoms. According to Hu Zhao's biography in Records, Wei Ji's calligraphy was widely emulated by others, alongside those of Hu, Handan Chun, Zhong Yao, and Wei Dan (韦诞; brother of Wei Kang). Shu Duan recorded that Wei Ji died at the age of 62 (by East Asian reckoning). Wei Guan's biography in Book of Jin recorded that Guan was 10 (by East Asian reckoning) when his father died.) Wei Guan inherited his father's peerage, and when he grew older became an official. Throughout the years, he became known for his capability and was continuously promoted. After Cao Huan became emperor, he became an Official of Justice (廷尉卿), and was known for his strength in logical thinking.

When the Wei regent Sima Zhao ordered the generals Zhong Hui and Deng Ai to attack Wei's rival state Shu Han in 263, Wei Guan served as Deng Ai's deputy. After the fall of Shu that year, Zhong Hui planned a rebellion, and the first step of his preparation was to falsely accuse Deng Ai of treason. Sima Zhao, believing Zhong Hui's accusations, ordered Deng Ai arrested, and Zhong Hui in turn ordered Wei Guan to arrest Deng Ai, hoping that Wei Guan would fail and be killed by Deng Ai so that he could further affirm his accusations against Deng Ai. Wei Guan knew this, so he surprised Deng Ai in the middle of the night and arrested him. When Zhong Hui rebelled later, Wei Guan pretended to be seriously ill, so Zhong Hui lowered his guard against Wei Guan. Later, Wei Guan participated in inciting the soldiers to start a mutiny against Zhong Hui and end the rebellion. Fearful that Deng Ai would then retaliate against him, he had Deng Ai tracked down and killed. When Du Yu publicly denounced Wei Guan, instead of becoming angry and retaliate against Du Yu, Wei Guan visited him and apologised. He also declined a larger fief that Sima Zhao was ready to bestow on him for his accomplishments.

== Career during the Jin dynasty ==
In September 265, Sima Zhao died and was succeeded as regent by his son Sima Yan (Emperor Wu). In February 266, Sima Yan usurped the throne from Cao Huan, thus ending the Cao Wei state and establishing the Jin dynasty. Throughout Emperor Wu's reign, Wei Guan continued to be an important official and general, serving in a variety of roles capably. As a result, one of his brothers and one of his sons were granted marquis titles. Wei Guan attempted to implement a revised civil service system, where the civil service examiner (中正) would have less input on grading officials, and actual job performance would become more important, but while Emperor Wu liked Wei Guan's suggestions, he did not carry them out.

In 271, Wei Guan was transferred to Senior General Who Attacks the North, where he was tasked with defending the northern frontier. During his tenure, the biggest threats to the frontier were the Wuhuan in the east and the Tuoba-Xianbei people in the west. When the supreme chieftain of the Tuoba, Tuoba Liwei sent his son and heir apparent, Tuoba Shamohan to pay tribute, Wei Guan convinced Emperor Wu to detain Shamohan while he bribed the Tuoba and Wuhuan chiefs in a plan to sow division and weaken them. Shamohan was only allowed to return in 277, but he was soon killed in a conspiracy by the chiefs, throwing the Tuoba into a state of turmoil while the Wuhuan submitted to Jin. The following year, Wei Guan was summoned back to the capital.

Wei Guan was one of the few officials who dared to openly speak to Emperor Wu about his choice of heir apparent, his son Sima Zhong, who was developmentally disabled. On one occasion, Emperor Wu, after Wei Guan hinted that Sima Zhong should not be crown prince, sent a number of inquiries to Sima Zhong to have answered. When the inquiries were appropriately answered (Note: Sima Zhong's wife Jia Nanfeng had someone else answer the inquiries for Sima Zhong.), Emperor Wu was happy and publicly showed Wei Guan the answers, embarrassing Wei Guan greatly and making it clear to other officials that Wei Guan had said something.

After Emperor Wu's death in May 290, Yang Jun, the father of Empress Dowager Yang, assumed the regency for Sima Zhong, who ascended the throne as Emperor Hui. However, in April 291, Yang Jun was overthrown and killed in a coup started by Empress Jia. Wei Guan was then made regent, along with Emperor Hui's granduncle Sima Liang in May. (Note: Sima Liang was at Xuchang and not the capital Luoyang when Yang Jun was killed.) Wei Guan and Sima Liang tried to get the government on track, but Empress Jia continued to interfere with governmental matters. They also became concerned about the violent temper of Emperor Hui's half-brother Sima Wei (Note: Wei was heavily involved in the coup against Yang Jun.) and therefore tried to strip him of his military command, but Sima Wei persuaded Empress Jia to let him keep his military command. Sima Wei's assistants Qi Sheng (岐盛) and Gongsun Hong (公孫宏) thereafter falsely told Empress Jia that Sima Liang and Wei Guan planned to depose the emperor. Empress Jia, who had already resented Wei Guan for having, during Emperor Wu's reign, suggested that he change his choice of heir apparent, also wanted more direct control over the government, and therefore resolved to undergo a second coup.

In summer 291, Empress Jia instructed Emperor Hui to write an imperial edict to Sima Wei, ordering him to have Sima Liang and Wei Guan removed from their offices. His forces thereby surrounded Sima Liang and Wei Guan's mansions, and while both men's subordinates recommended resistance, each declined and was captured. Against what the edict said, both were killed – Sima Liang with his heir Sima Ju (司馬矩) and Wei Guan with nine of his sons and grandsons. After Empress Jia, concerned about Sima Wei's power, then falsely declared that the edict was forged by Sima Wei and had him executed, Wei Guan was posthumously rehabilitated and restored to the status of a duke.

== Calligraphy ==
Wei Guan was a famous calligrapher during his time, being a master of the cursive script. He and his colleague, Suo Jing, (Note: father of Suo Chen) were collectively referred to as "One terrace, two wonders" due to their calligraphy skills. The two were also compared to the Eastern Han dynasty calligrapher, Zhang Zhi, and a common saying in their day was "[Wei] Guan received Boying's tendons, [Suo] Jing received Boying's flesh". (Note: Boying is Zhang Zhi's courtesy name.) Wei Guan's granddaughter, Wei Shuo, was another famous calligrapher, most known for being the teacher of Wang Xizhi.

== See also ==
- Lists of people of the Three Kingdoms
