= Wei Shuo =

Chinese calligrapher (272–349)

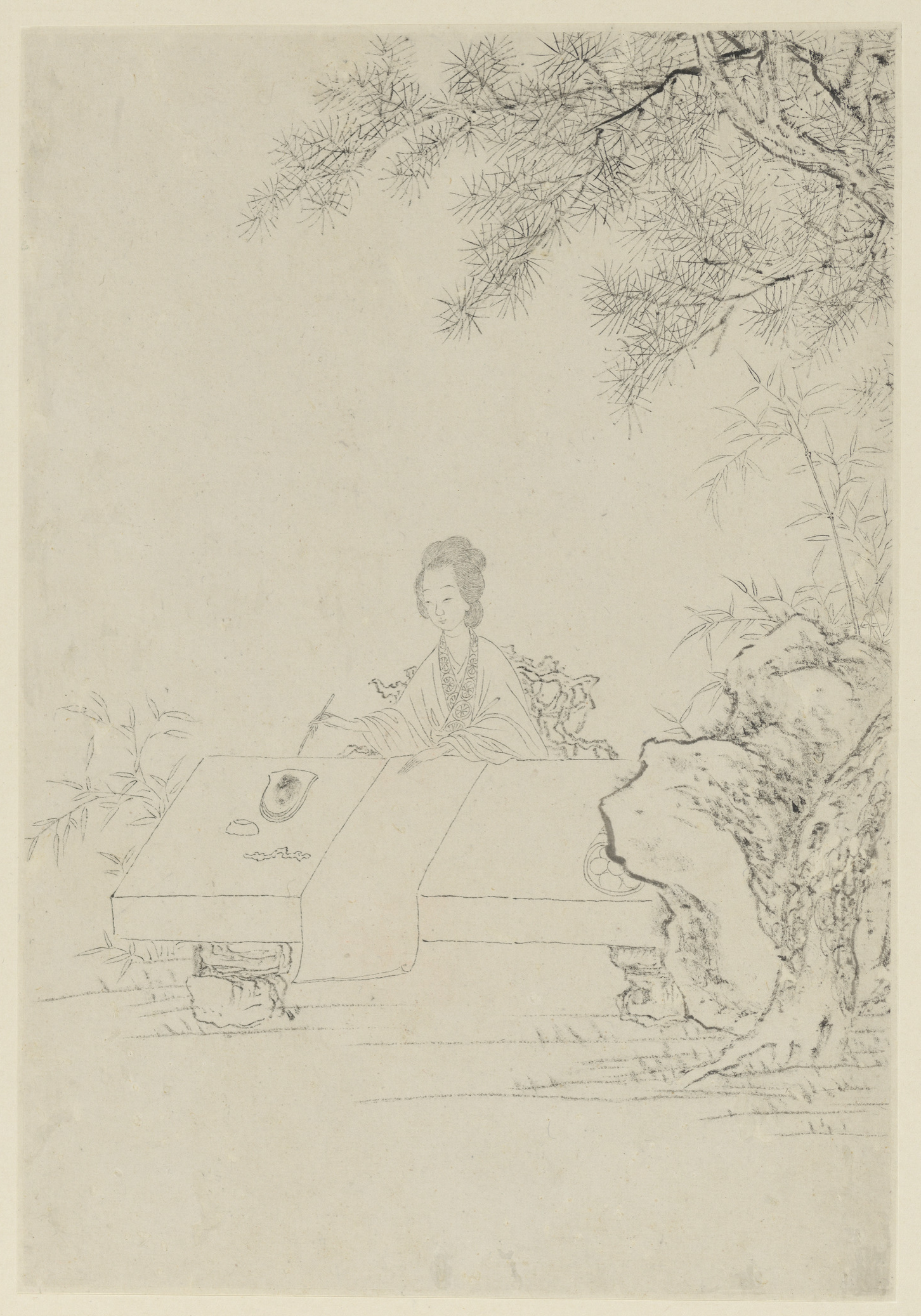
Wei Shuo, as painted by Gai Qi, 1799

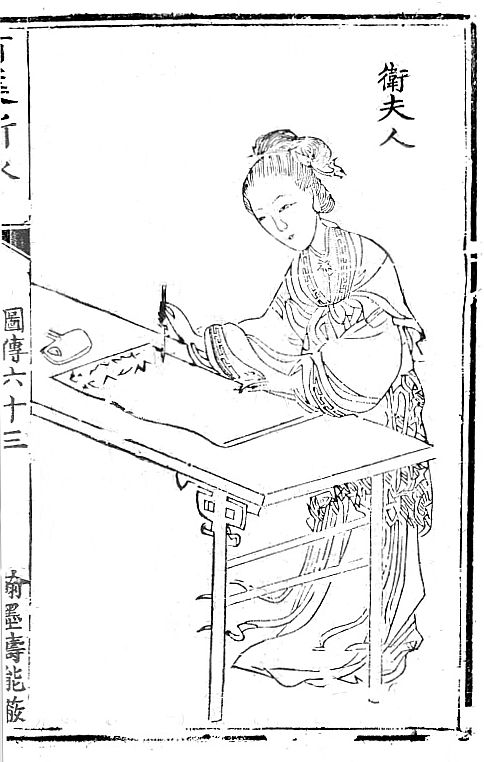
An 18th century drawing of Wei Shuo

Wei Shuo (simplified Chinese: 卫铄; traditional Chinese: 衛鑠; pinyin: Wèi Shuò, 272 – 349), courtesy name Mouyi (茂猗), sobriquet He'nan (和南), commonly addressed as Lady Wei (衛夫人), who lived during the Eastern Jin, was one of the most famous of all Chinese calligraphers in history. She was a pioneer who established new rules that developed the regular script. As a teacher, her most notable disciple was Wang Xizhi.

== Biography ==
Born in modern Xia, Shanxi, Wei was the daughter of Wei Zhan (衛展) or the daughter or younger sister of Wei Heng (衛恆); a clan elder was Wei Guan, also a famed calligrapher. She came from a family well-known for their skill in literature and calligraphy, and her uncle and cousin were also talented calligraphers.

Wei was married to Li Ju (李矩), (Note: not to be confused with the Jin general of the same name. Wei Shuo's husband did not have a biography in the Book of Jin, while her son Li Chong does (in vol.92). A Jin Zhugong Zan annotation to Li Tong's biography in Sanguozhi recorded that Li Chong's father was a son of Li Bing, son of Li Xu, son of Li Tong.) the Governor of Ding Prefecture. (Note: Li Chong's biography in Book of Jin recorded that his father was Inspector of Jiangzhou. The Jin Zhugong Zan annotation to Li Tong's biography in Sanguozhi also recorded the same post for Li Ju. The error could have originated from vol.144 of Quan Jin Wen, which recorded that Li Ju was Inspector of Tingzhou (汀州刺史).) Wei and Li had at least a son: Li Chong (李充), also a calligrapher and a Palace Secretarial Attendant (中書侍郎). She was presumably widowed relatively early as Li Chong was recorded to be orphaned at a young age.

She may have been taught the style that Zhong Yao used; however, judging from comments describing her style as thin, Wei's style may have been more narrow than Zhong's wider style.

After her time studying the famous works of classic calligraphers, she began developing her own style, that focused on mimicking the shapes and motions found in nature, creating work of grace and vigour that became the benchmark for calligraphy from then onwards. She wrote a monumentally influential treatise on her theories of calligraphy; Wei's The Picture of Ink Brush (筆陣圖) describes the Seven Powers (七勢) that later became the famous Eight Principles of Yong. She famously compared calligraphy to war: the paper to a battlefield, the brush to a weapon and the ink to ammunition.

== Works ==
Wei's other works include:

- Famous Concubine Inscription (名姬帖, Ming Ji Tie)
- The Inscription of Weishi He'nan (衛氏和南帖, Weishi He'nan Tie)
