= Gu xiaoshuo gouchen =

Chinese literature collection

Gu xiaoshuo gouchen (simplified Chinese: 古小说钩沈; traditional Chinese: 古小說鉤沉; pinyin: Gǔ xiǎoshuō gōuchén; Wade–Giles: Ku hsiao-shuo kou-ch'en; "Rediscovering lost ancient novellas" and other translations) is a collection of lost stories from before the Tang dynasty, compiled from various books. It was assembled by the Chinese writer Lu Xun 魯迅 (1881–1936), a leading figure of modern Chinese literature.

== Introduction ==
The collection is arranged chronologically and comprises a total of 36 books (with xiaoshuo), from Qingshizi 青史子 of pre-Qin times to Jingyiji 旌異記 by Hou Bai 侯白 of the Sui dynasty. The sources are primarily drawn from the Hanshu (Yiwenzhi), the Suishu (Jingjizhi), and the Xin Tangshu (Yiwenzhi), as well as from additional texts not preserved in official historical records. The collection is notable both for its wide range of sources and for its careful textual criticism. It was compiled in 1911 and included in the Complete Works of Lu Xun (Lu Xun quanji, 魯迅全集) in 1938. The material was also used for the first seven chapters of his book Zhongguo xiaoshuo shilüe (中国小说史略; A Brief History of Chinese Fiction, 1925).

Wu Baolin 吴宝林 of the Chinese Department at Peking University remarks on the collection and the editing of lost works:

1938年6月间，《鲁迅全集》普及本问世，同年8月1日纪念本也正式出版。而就在1938年10月16日，郑振铎在《文艺阵地》52上发表了《鲁迅的辑佚工作—为鲁迅先生逝世二周年纪念而作》（此文写作时间当在1938年9-10月间），其中提到：“乾、嘉、道、咸(一七三六—一八六一)，尤为辑佚工作的全盛时期。马国翰的《玉函山房所辑佚书》，王谟的《汉魏遗书钞》，《汉唐地理书钞》和甘泉黄氏的《汉学堂丛书》均是洋洋大观，卷帙相当浩瀚的。

In June 1938, the popular edition of the “Collected Works of Lu Xun” was published, and on 1 August of the same year, the commemorative edition was officially released. On 16 October 1938, Zheng Zhenduo published in issue 52 of Wenyi zhendi the article “Lu Xun’s Work on the Collection and Restoration of Lost Texts – Written for the Second Anniversary of Lu Xun’s Death” (Lu Xun de jiyi gongzuo — wei Lu Xun xiansheng shishi er zhounian jinian er zuo 鲁迅的辑佚工作—为鲁迅先生逝世二周年纪念而作), which appears to have been written sometime between September and October 1938. In it, he states: “The periods Qian, Jia, Dao, and Xian (1736–1861) were particularly the golden age of the collection and restoration of lost works.” Ma Guohan's Yuhan Shanfang suoji yishu, Wang Mo's Han-Wei yishu chao, the Han-Tang dili shuchao, and the Hanxuetang congshu of the Huang family from Ganquan are all splendid collections of considerable size.“

== Overview ==
Included in the collection are:

- Qingshizi 青史子 (NN)
- Peizi Yulin 裴子語林 (Jin) Pei Qi 裴啓
- Guozi 郭子 (Jin) Guo Chengzhi 郭澄之
- Xiaolin 笑林 (Han) Handan Chun 含單淳
- Sushuo 俗說 (Liang) Shen Yue 沈約
- Xiaoshuo (Yin Yun xiaoshuo) 小說 (殷芸小說) (Liang) Yin Xun 殷芸
- Shuishi 水飾 (Tang) Du Bao 杜寳
- Lieyi zhuan 列異傳 (Wei) Cao Pi 曹丕 (魏文帝 Emperor Wei Wendi)
- Guyi zhuan 古異傳 (Liu-Song) Yuan Wangshou 袁王壽
- Dai Zuo zhenyi zhuan (Zhenyi zhuan) 戴祚甄異傳 (甄異傳) (Jin) Dai Zuo 戴祚
- Shuyiji 述異記 (Jin) Zu Chongzhi 祖沖之
- Xunshi linggui zhi (Lingguizhi) 荀氏靈鬼志 (靈鬼志) (Jin) Xun N 荀□
- Zu Taizhi zhiguai 祖台之志怪 (Jin) Zu Taizhi 祖台之
- Kongshi zhiguai 孔氏志怪 (Jin) Kong N 孔□
- Shenguailu 神怪錄 (NN)
- Liu Zhilin shenlu (Shenlu) 劉之遴神錄 (神錄) (Liang) Liu Zhilin 劉之遴
- Qixieji 齊諧記(Liu-Song) Dongyang Wuyi 東陽無疑
- Youminglu 幽明錄(Liu-Song) Liu Yiqing 劉義慶
- Xieshi guishen liezhuan 謝氏鬼神列傳 ()Xie N 謝□
- Zhishi zhiguai ji (Zhiguaiji) 殖氏志怪記 (志怪記) (Jin) Zhi N 殖□
- Jilingji 集靈記 (Northern Qi) Yan Zhitui 顏之推
- Han Wu gushi 漢武故事 (Han) Ban Gu 班固
- Duji 妒記 (NN)
- Yiwenji 異聞記 (NN)
- Xuanzhongji 玄中記 Guo Pu 郭璞
- Lushi yilin (Yilin) 陸氏異林 (異林) (Jin) Lu Yun 陸雲
- Cao Pi zhiguai 曹毗志怪 (Jin) Cao Pi 曹毗
- Guo Jichan jiyi ji (Jiyiji) 郭季產集異記 (集異記) (Liu-Song) Guo Jichan 郭季產
- Wang Fu Shenyiji (Shenyiji) 王浮神異記 (神異記) (Jin) Wang Fu 王浮
- Xuyiji 續異記 (NN)
- Luyi zhuan 錄異傳 (NN)
- Za guishen zhiguai 雜鬼神志怪 (NN)
- Xiangyiji 祥異記 (NN)
- Xuanyanji 宣驗記 (Liu-Song) Liu Yiqing 劉義慶
- Mingxiangji 冥祥記 (Southern Qi) Wang Yan 王琰
- Jingyiji 旌異記 (Sui) Hou Bai 侯白
