= Xiaocao'e =

Xiaocao'e 小曹娥镇
- Town
- Location in the north-east in Zhejiang
- Coordinates: 30°13′10″N 121°4′10″E
- Country: People's Republic of China
- Province: Zhejiang
- Prefecture-level city: Ningbo
- County-level city: Yuyao

Area
  - Total: 33.4 km^{2} (12.9 sq mi)

Population (2017)
  - Total: 40,400
  - Density: 1,210/km^{2} (3,130/sq mi)
- Time zone: UTC+8 (China Standard)
- Website: http://www.yy.gov.cn/col/col1229143566/index.html

Xiaocao'e (Chinese: 小曹娥; pinyin: Xiǎocáo'é; lit. 'Small Cao E') is a town located in the administrative territorial entity of Yuyao, Ningbo, Zhejiang province, China, established in 1949 and named after Cao E (130-143), the filial piety daughter who drowned when she tried to save her father.

Xiaocao'e has a densely populated area of 33.4 square kilometres with a population of 40400 (2017) and the town contains eight administrative territorial entities, one of them is Cao'ecun (Cao E village). The town is situated approx 50 km from the harbour of Ningbo and is known for her industry, fruit, honey, mustard, pepper and cotton.

In October 2021 this town was chosen to one of the 1000 top towns in China at place 553.

== Climate ==
The region around Xiaocao'e has a warm and temperate climate without a dry season but with a lot of rain in the hot summers, a climate classification Cfa according to Köppen. The average humidity is between 70-80%, with the highest humidity in June and the lowest in April. The average annual precipitation is 1778 millimetres. The wettest month is June, with an average of 285 mm of precipitation, and the driest month is January, with 60 mm of precipitation. The average temperature is between 5 degrees Celsius in winter (January) and 28 degrees Celsius in the middle of summer (July), with occasional peaks. Hours of sunshine range from 5 hours/day in winter and 10 hours/day in the summer.

Xiaocao'e

Climate chart (precipitation, max. and min. temperature)
J	F	M	A	M	J	J	A	S	O	N	D
60 8 2	137 13 3	152 18 8	125 23 12	149 29 16	285 32 20	139 33 25	251 30 24	183 27 20	143 24 14	68 19 8	85 11 2
- █ Average max. and min. temperatures in °C
- █ Precipitation totals in mm
- Source: NASA
Imperial conversion
J	F	M	A	M	J	J	A	S	O	N	D
2.4 46 36	5.4 55 37	6 64 46	4.9 73 54	5.9 84 61	11 90 68	5.5 91 77	9.9 86 75	7.2 81 68	5.6 75 57	2.7 66 46	3.3 52 36
- █ Average max. and min. temperatures in °F
- █ Precipitation totals in inches
