= Hu Zhao =

Hu Zhao (胡昭), courtesy name Kongming (孔明) (162 - 250 (Note: Hu Zhao's biography in Sanguozhi indicate that he was 89 (by East Asian reckoning) when he died in the 2nd year of the Jia'ping era of Cao Fang's reign.)), was a Chinese hermit and calligrapher who lived during the late Eastern Han and Cao Wei dynasties.

== Life ==
Hu Zhao was from Yingchuan Commandery. In the war-torn final years of the Eastern Han Dynasty, he initially sought refuge in Ji province, where he declined Yuan Shao's offer of recruitment, and lived in the countryside. When Cao Cao was appointed Minister of Works (sikong) and later Imperial Chancellor, he repeatedly requested Hu Zhao to join him. While Hu accepted the offers, after joining Cao's service, he explained that he was useless in both state governance and military matters, and sincerely asked to be released from service. Cao Cao replied, "To each his own; different people have different preferences, be they serving a government or leaving service. I respect your decision and will not force you."

Before Sima Yi became a government official, he was a good friend of Hu Zhao's. A man named Zhou Sheng (周生), who hailed from the same commandery as Hu, wanted to kill Sima Yi. Once Hu Zhao heard of the plot, he went to meet Zhou in a mountainous area between the Xiao Mountains and Mianchi County (both in modern-day Henan). At first, Hu tried to persuade Zhou to stop the plot; Zhou refused. Hu then began crying; touched by Hu's sincerity, Zhou agreed not to kill Sima. Before they parted, Hu chopped down a jujube tree as a part of the vow. Although Hu helped saved Sima, he never told anyone else about it. Nonetheless, word of his honour and reputation spread among the people in his hometown.

Hu Zhao was well versed in historical texts. His calligraphy, alongside those of Zhong Yao, Handan Chun, Wei Ji (卫觊) (Note: father of Wei Guan), and Wei Dan (韦诞) (Note: brother of Wei Kang), were widely emulated by others.

One final attempt was made by the Cao Wei state to recruit him in 250, and they were unsuccessful due to his death that year at the age of 88.
