= Cao'e Temple =

Chinese temple

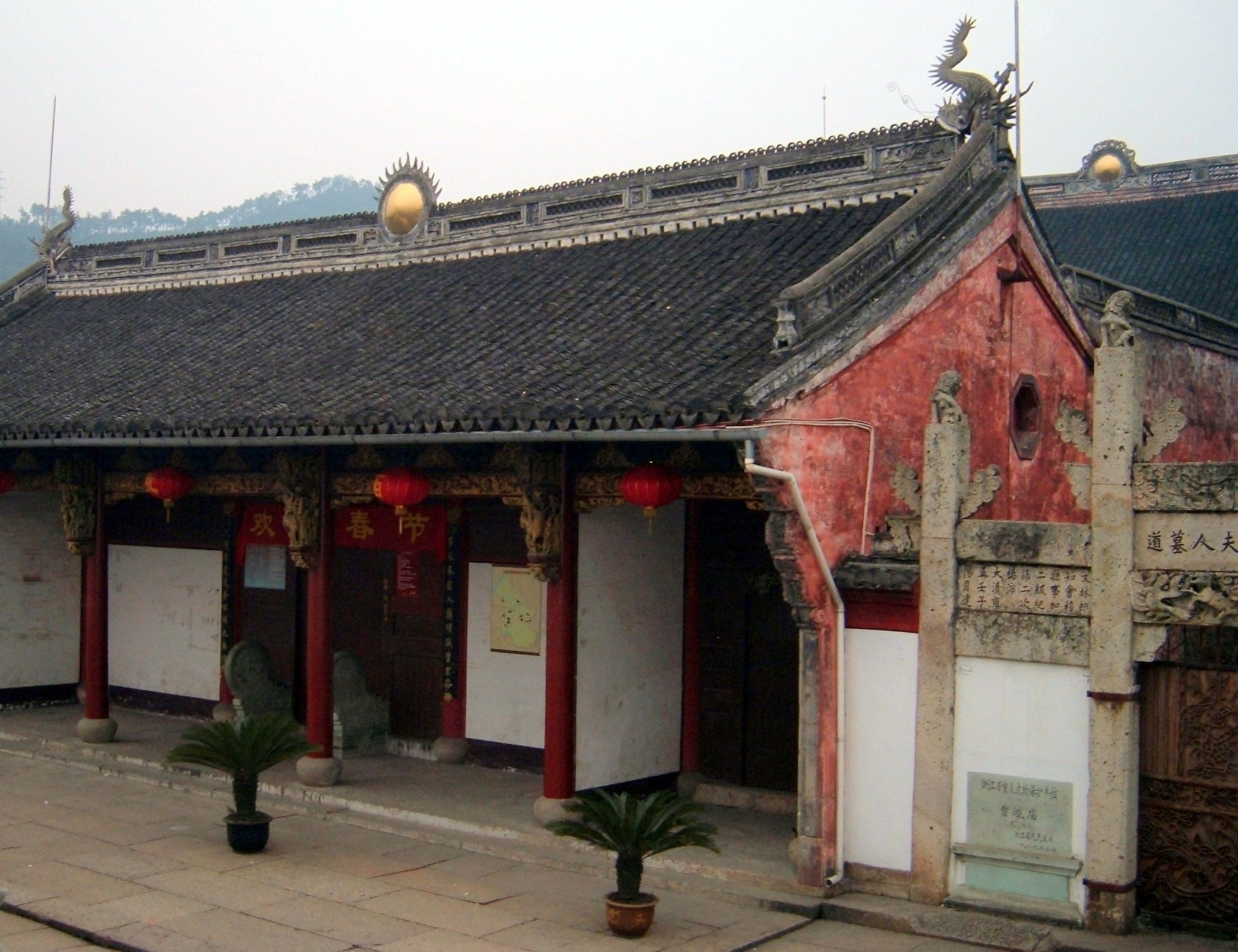
Cao'e Temple faced east, looking over the Cao'e Rivier, in Shangyu, Zhejiang, China.

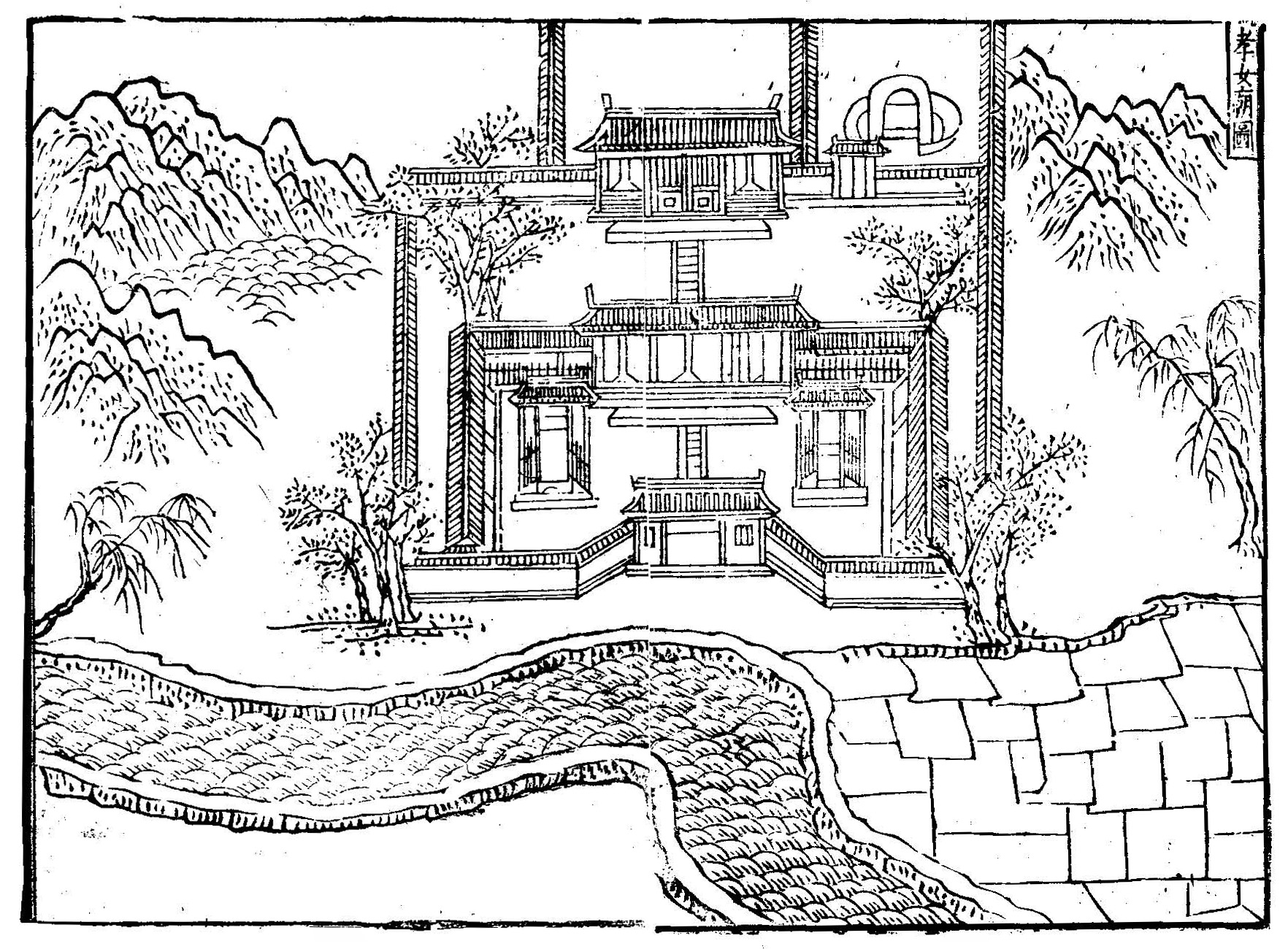
Drawing of the Cao'e Temple (1587)

The Cao'e Temple (Chinese: 曹娥庙) was built to honor Cao E, a young girl who was drowned when she tried to save her father in an act of filial piety. The temple was built for the first time in the year 151, and has been relocated, rebuild, restored and expanded several times. The last time this temple was rebuilt was in 1929 after a huge fire, the restoration lasted until 1936.

== Location and description ==
The Cao'e Temple is situated in the Shangyu District, Shaoxing, Zhejiang Province, China. The temple faces to the east and overlooks the Cao'e River, with on the rear side of the temple a view of the Phoenix mountain. The temple is built on an area of 6000 square meters, the temple itself measures 3840 square meters. Inside the temple, several wall paintings have been created describing the story of Cao E. The temple has been built with many stone carving and wood carving.

In 1093 Emperor Song Zhezong had a main hall built in the temple. There are more than 30 steles donated by famous people and exhibited in the temple in honor of Cao E, some of these famous people are: Mi Fu, Tang Yin, Zhu Yunming, Wen Zhengming, Chiang Kai-shek.

== Cultural ==
The Cao'e Temple has a rich cultural heritage of nearly 2,000 years and has a high artistic taste, and is renowned at home and abroad for its carvings, murals, couplets and calligraphy. Since 1989, the Cao'e Temple has been included in the list of protected national and cultural relics. Every year from May 15–22, there is a festival in the Cao'e Temple, with a Cao E memorial service at the temple on May 22. The temple is called the first temple of Jiangnan.

== Photo Gallery ==
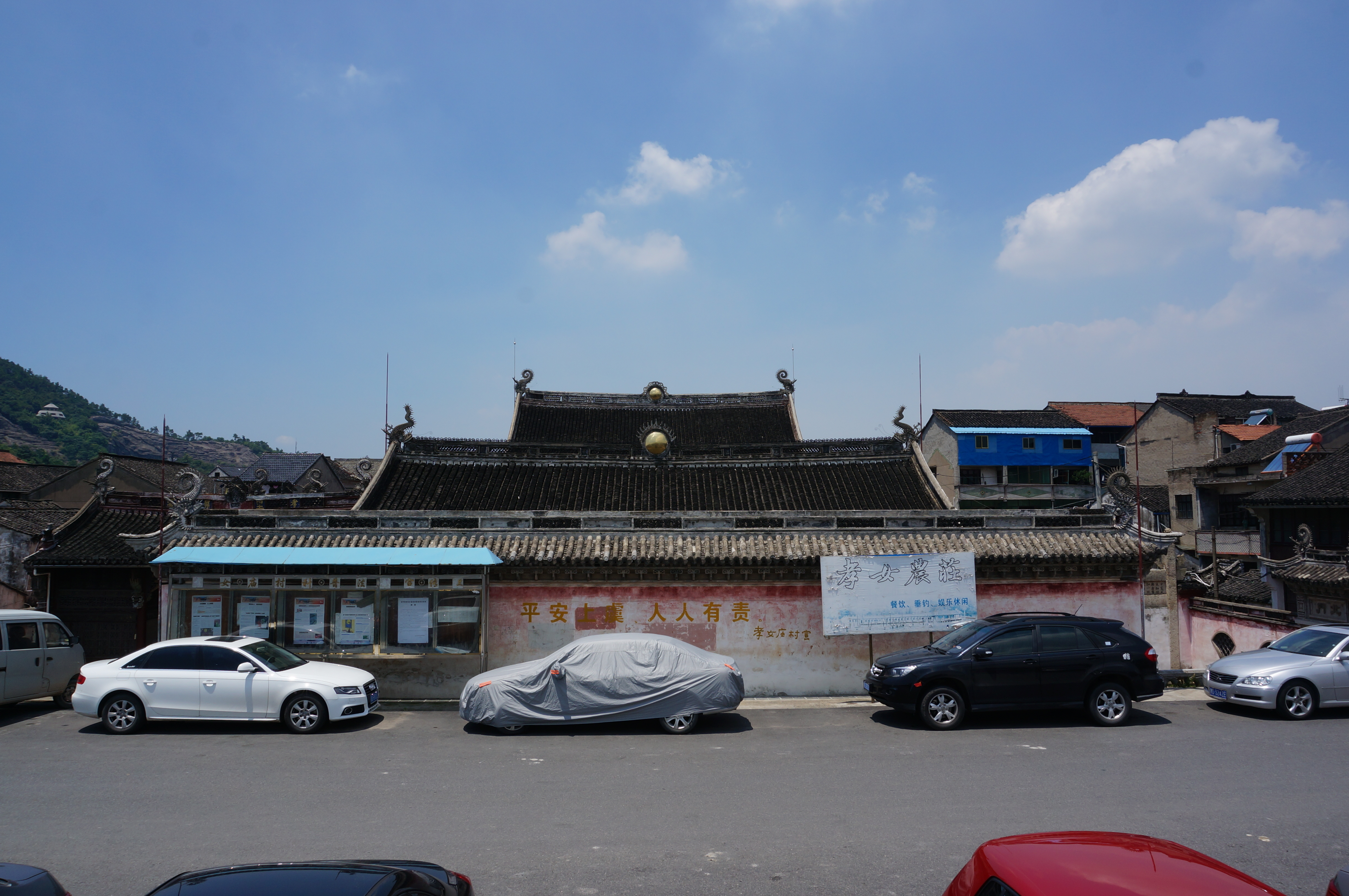
The skyline of the complex

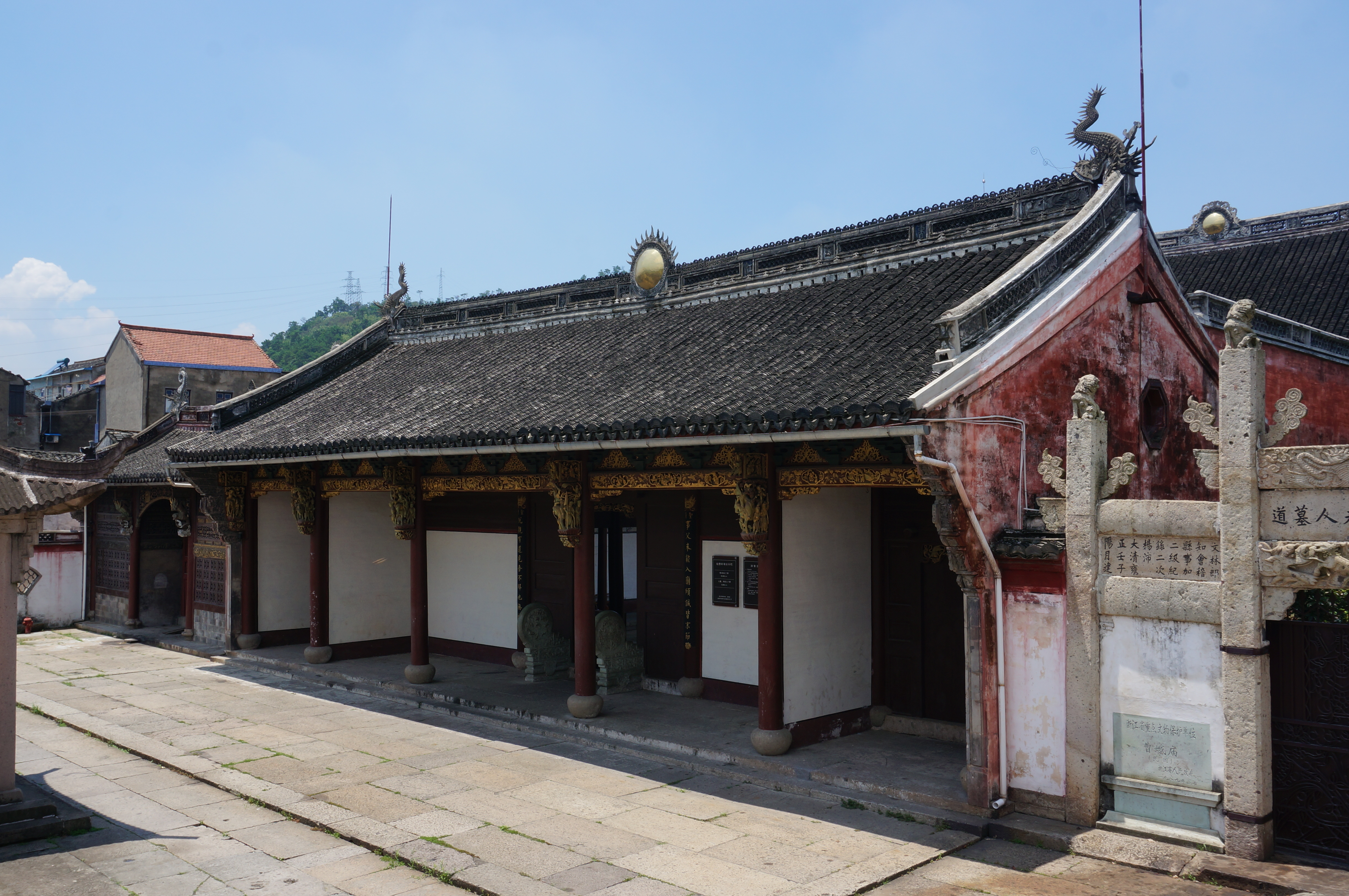
The Façade of the temple looking east over the Cao'e River

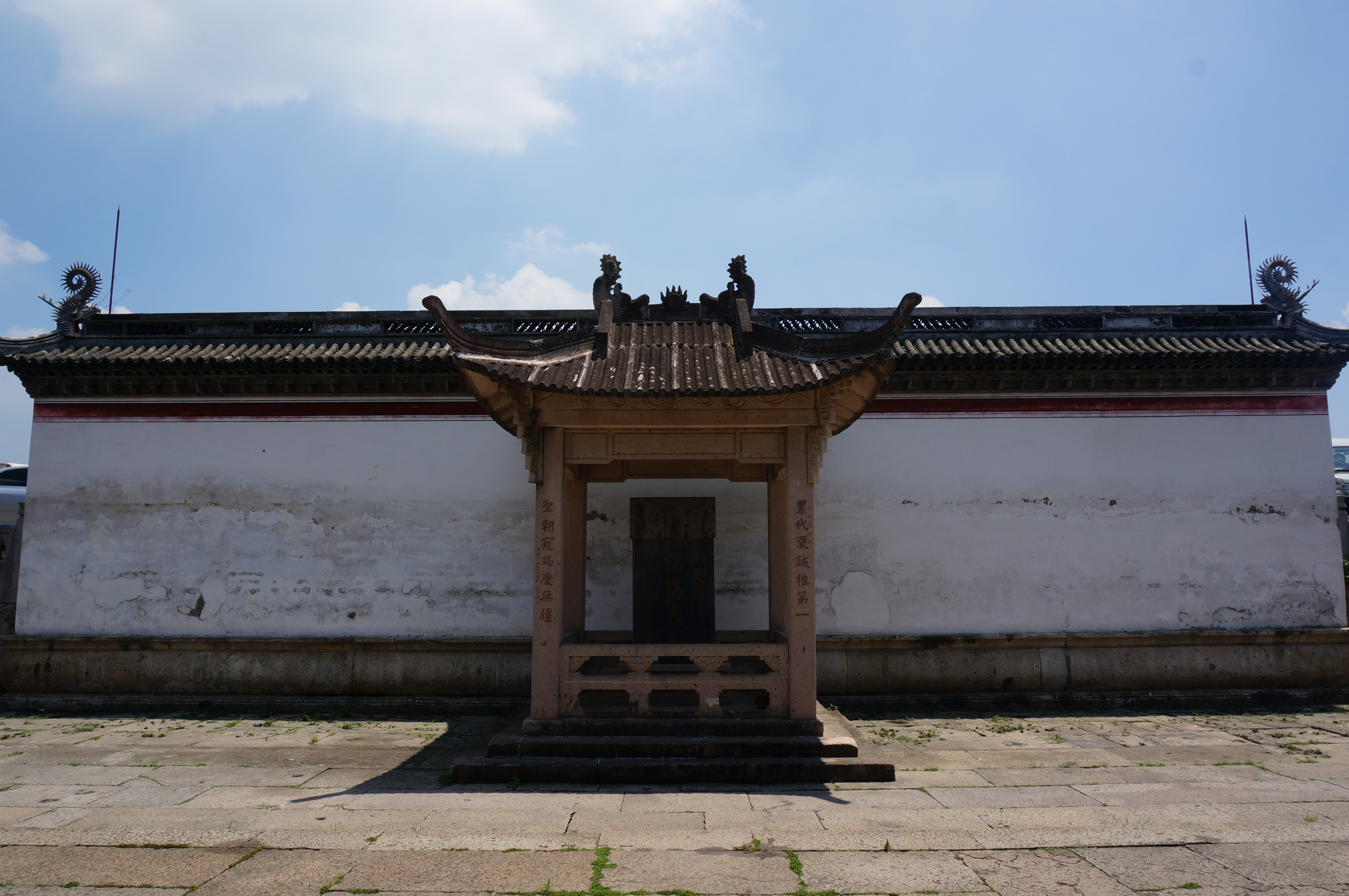
The western side of the façade and the Royal Tablet Pavilion

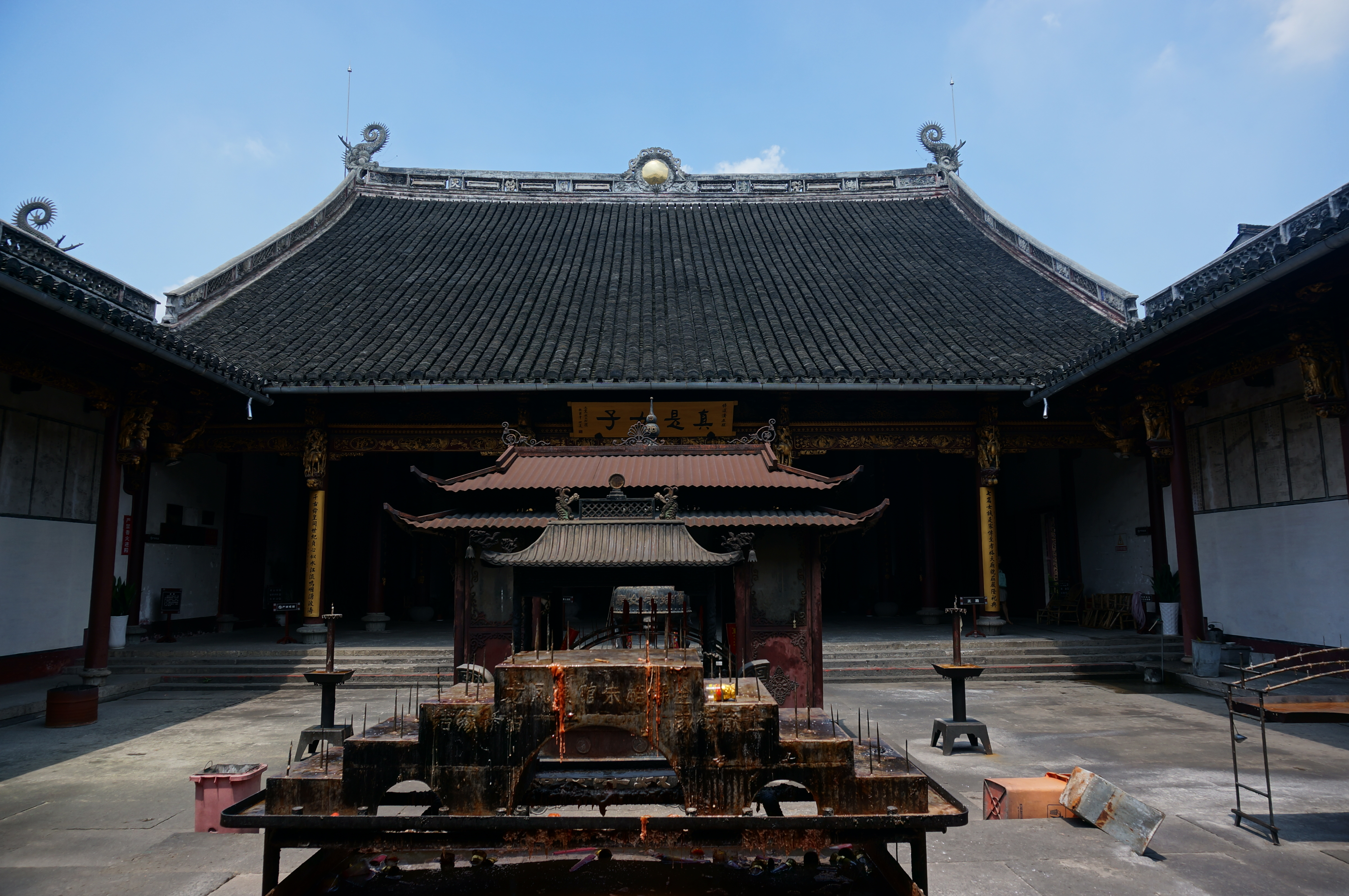
The main hall

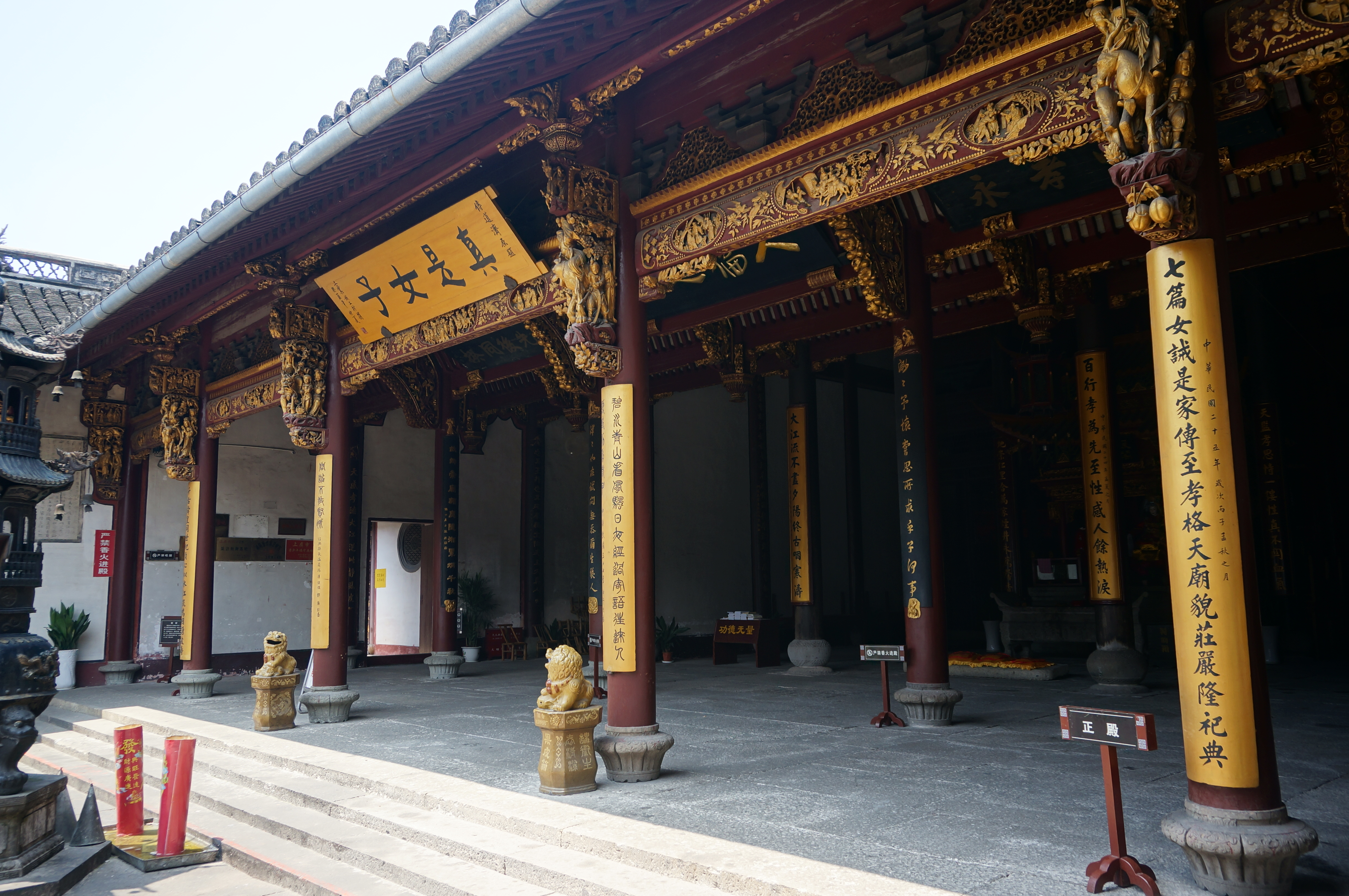
A closer view of the main hall

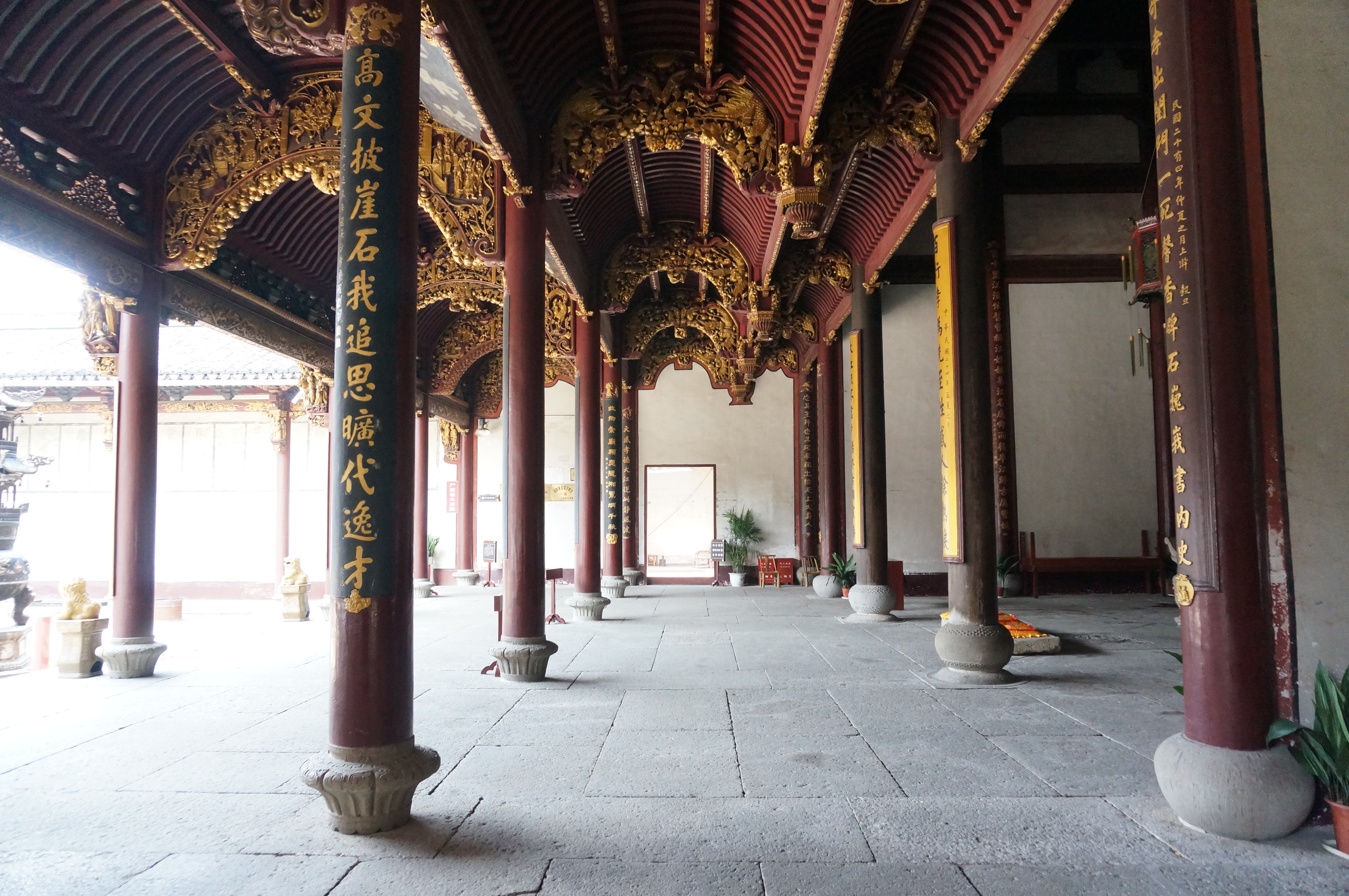
The front of the main hall

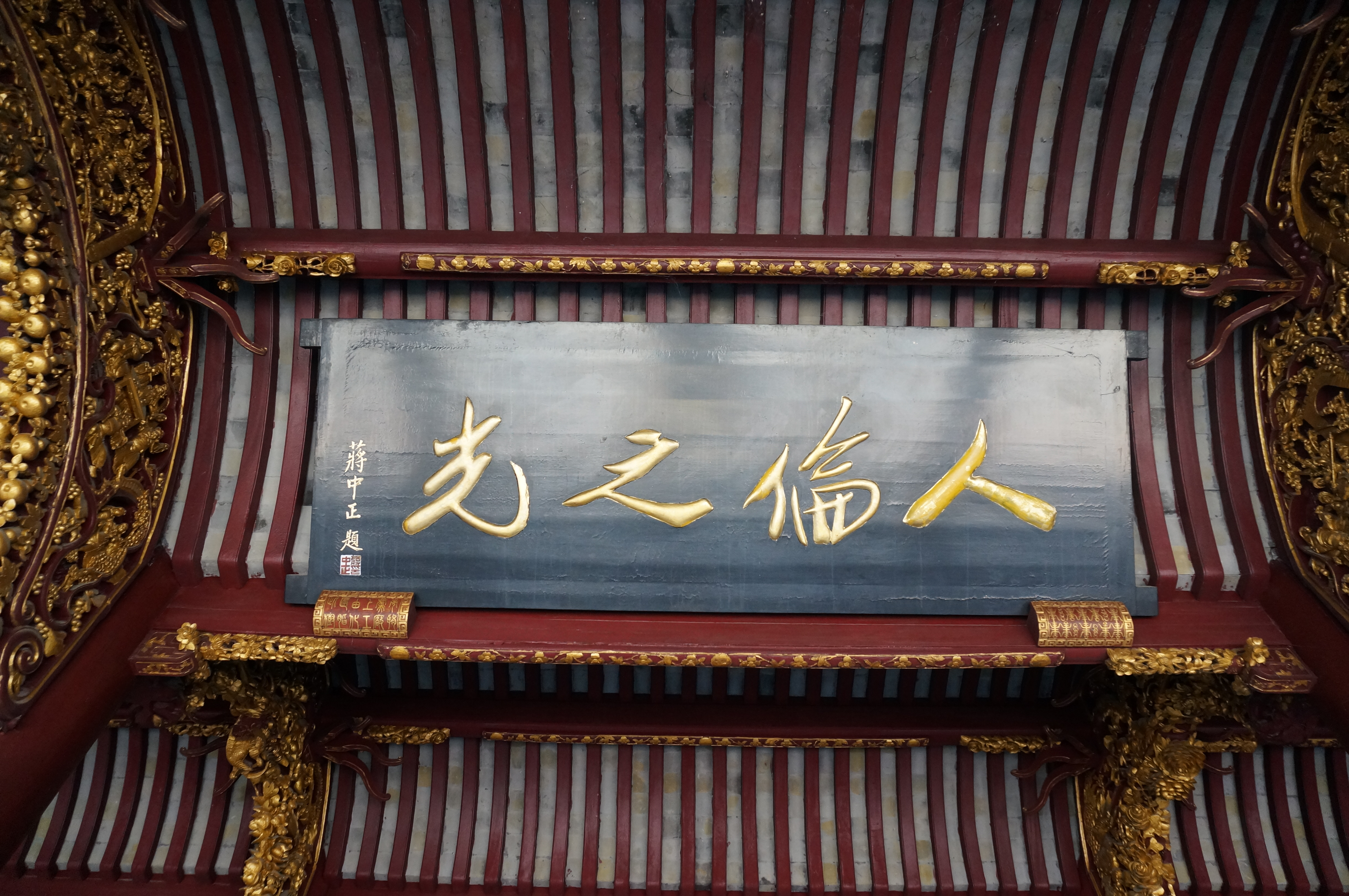
Plaque inscribed by Jiang Zhongzheng with the title 'The Light of Humanity'

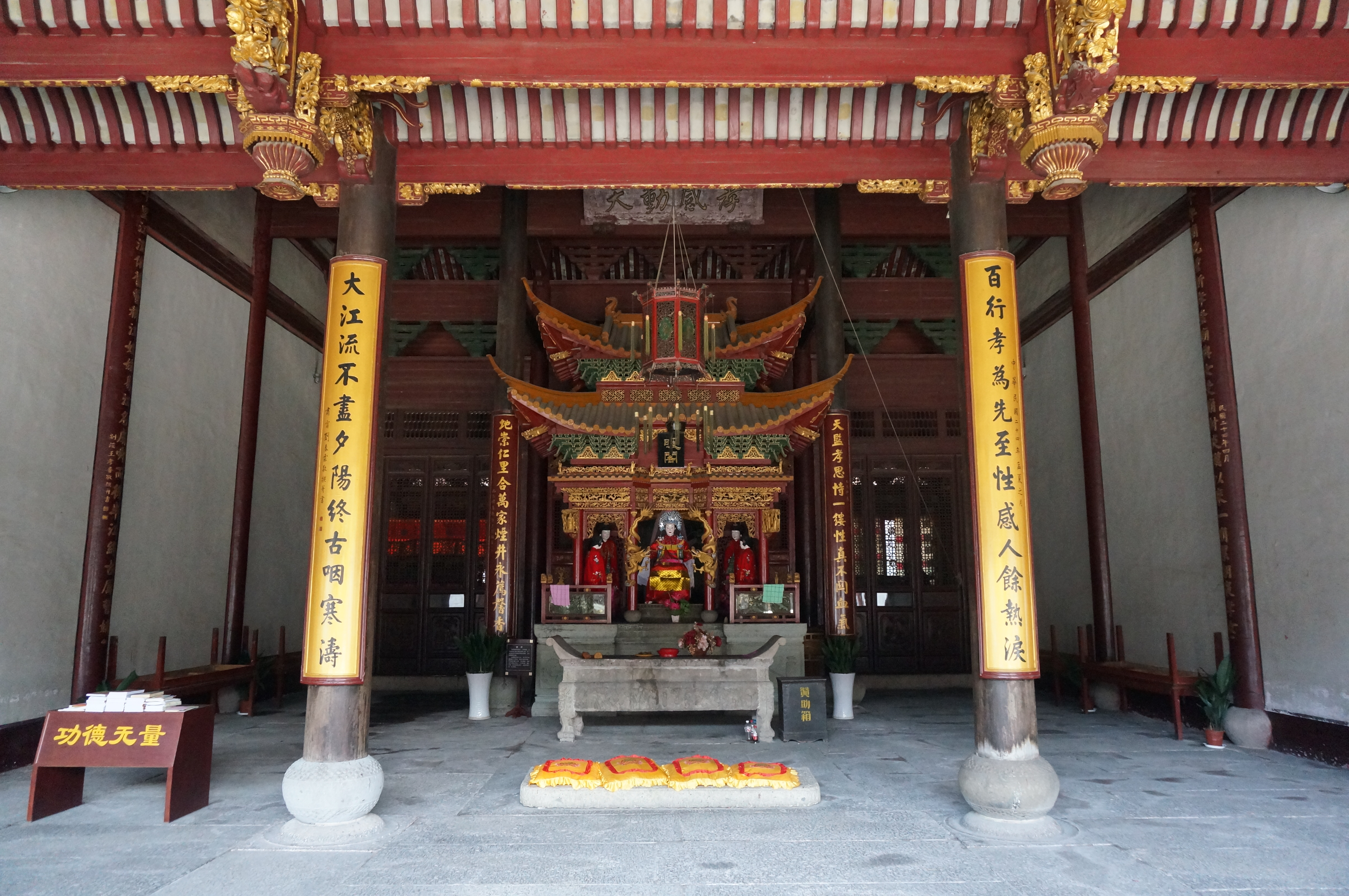
Interior view of the main hall, with the statue of Cao'e in a pavilion

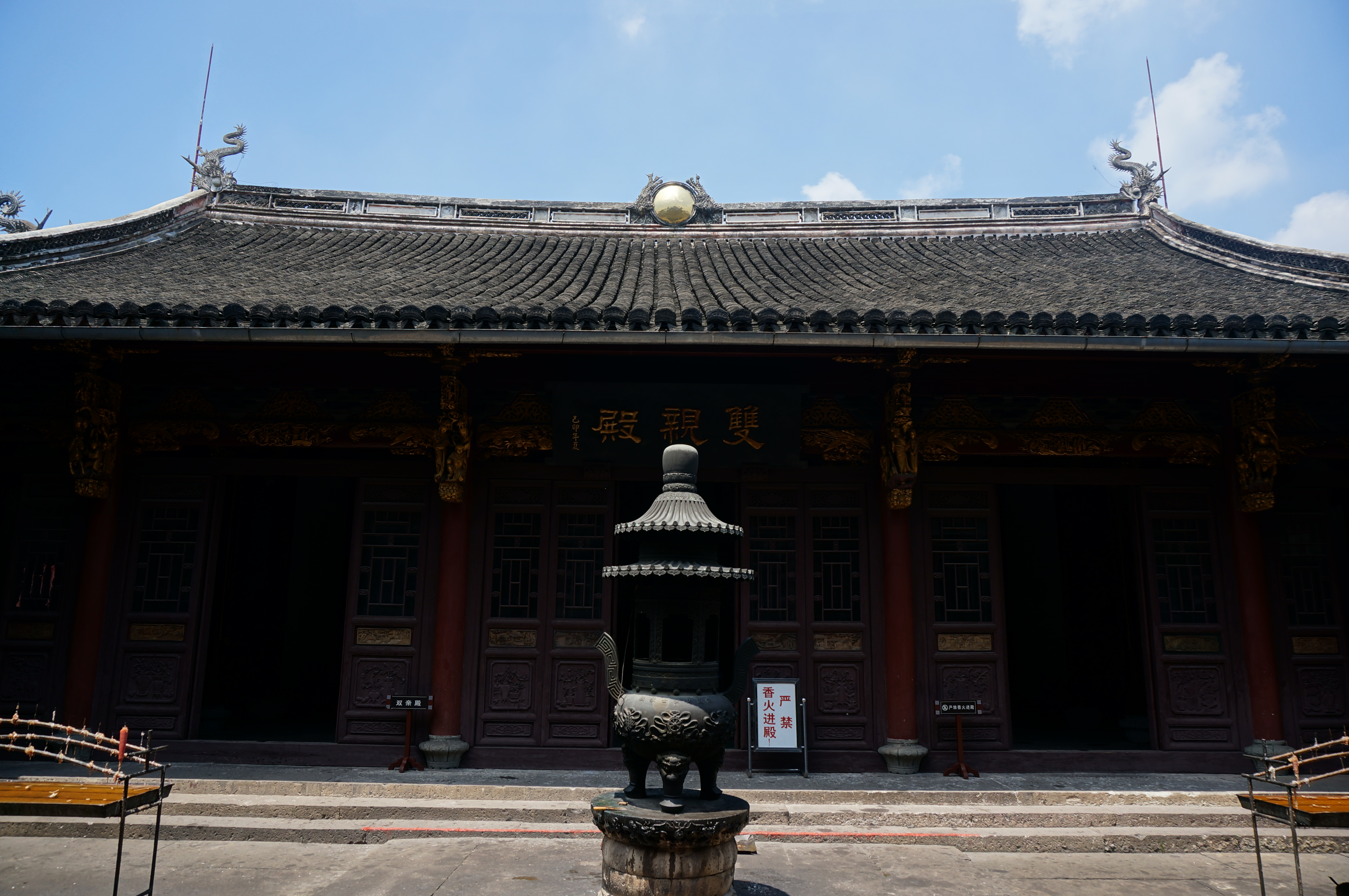
Rear Hall

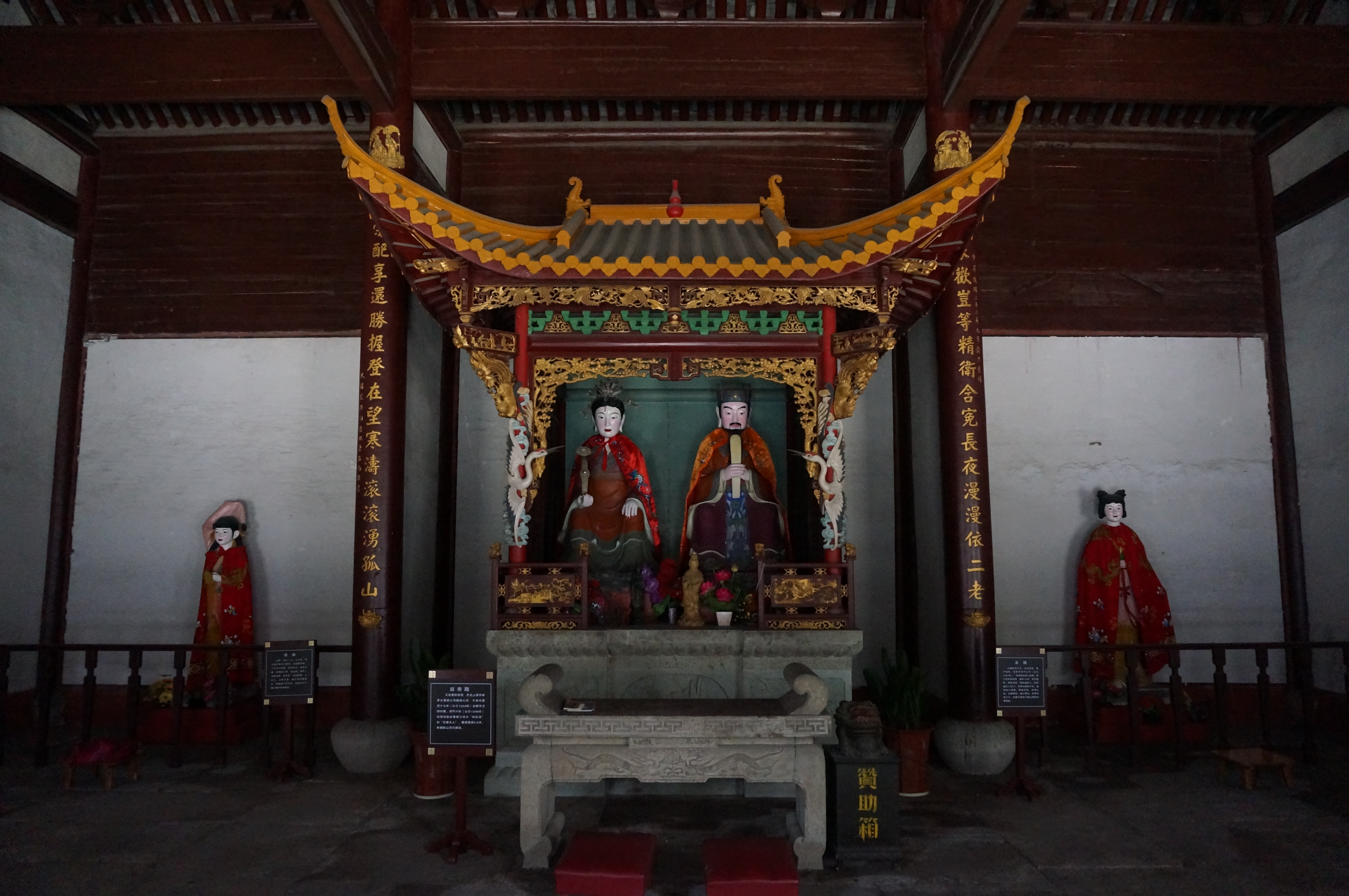
Interior view of the back hall, with the statue of Cao'e's parents in a pavilion, flanked by statues

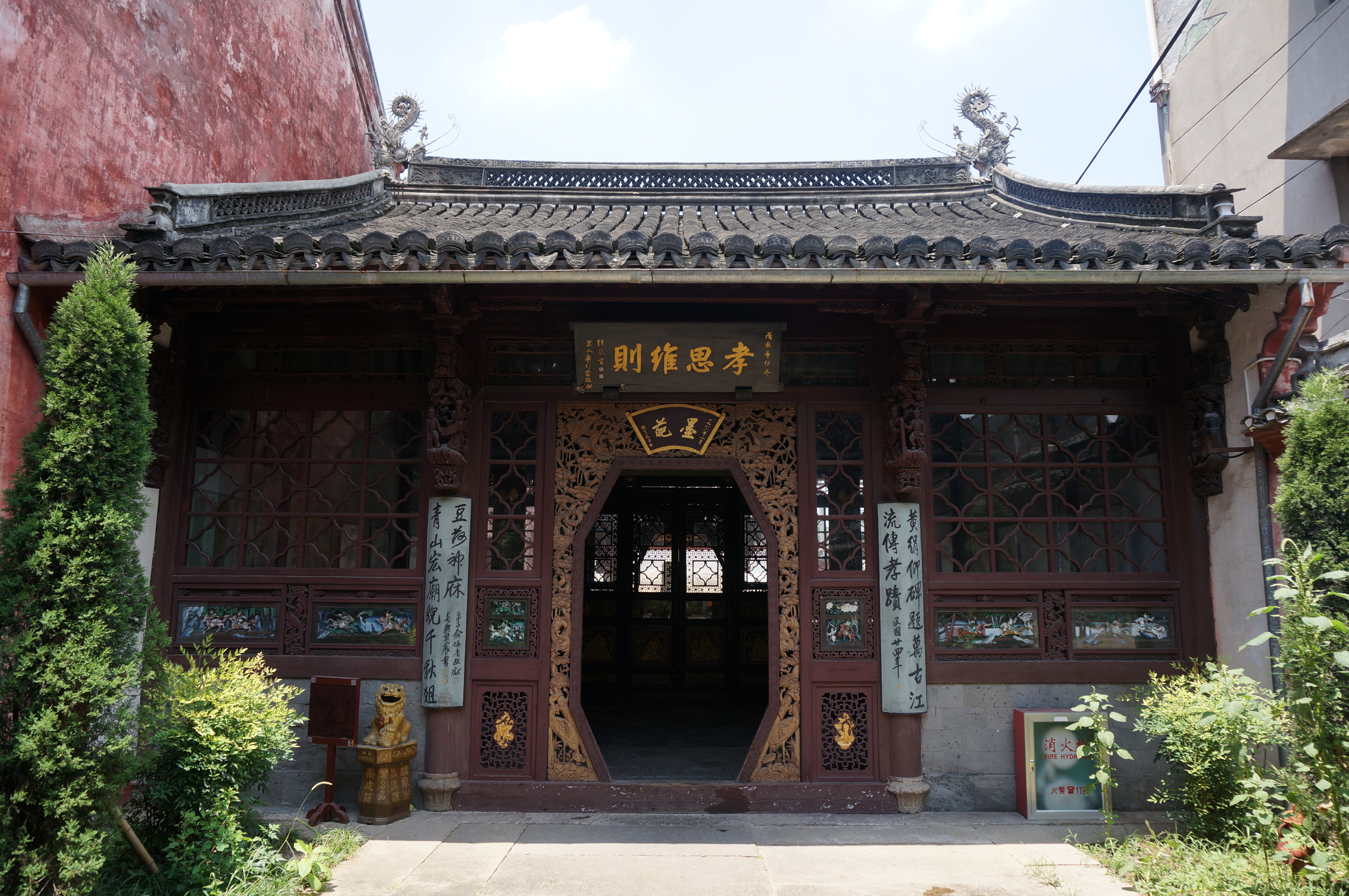
The Pavilion on the Northern Axis

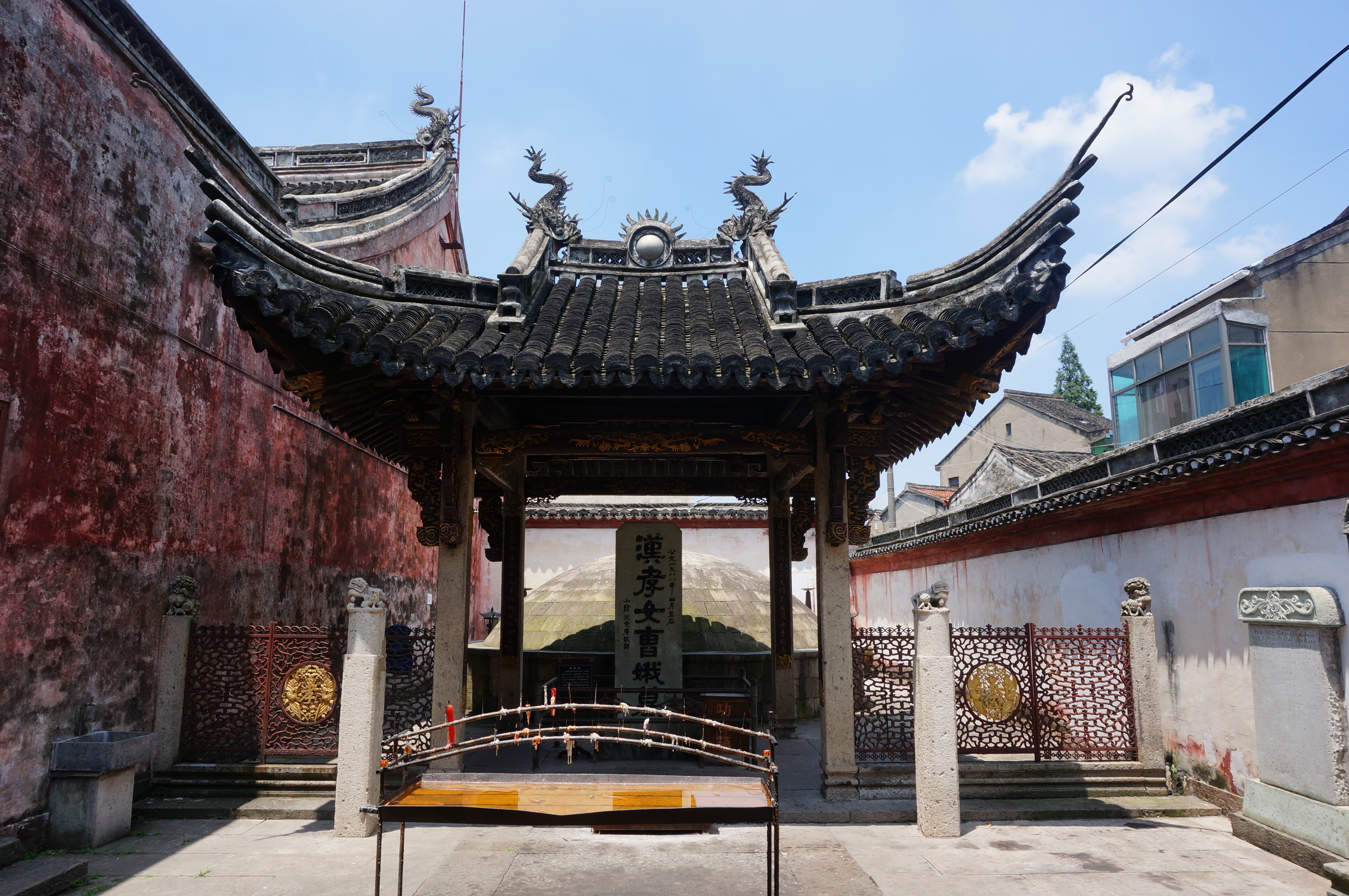
Cao'e's tomb on the northern axis

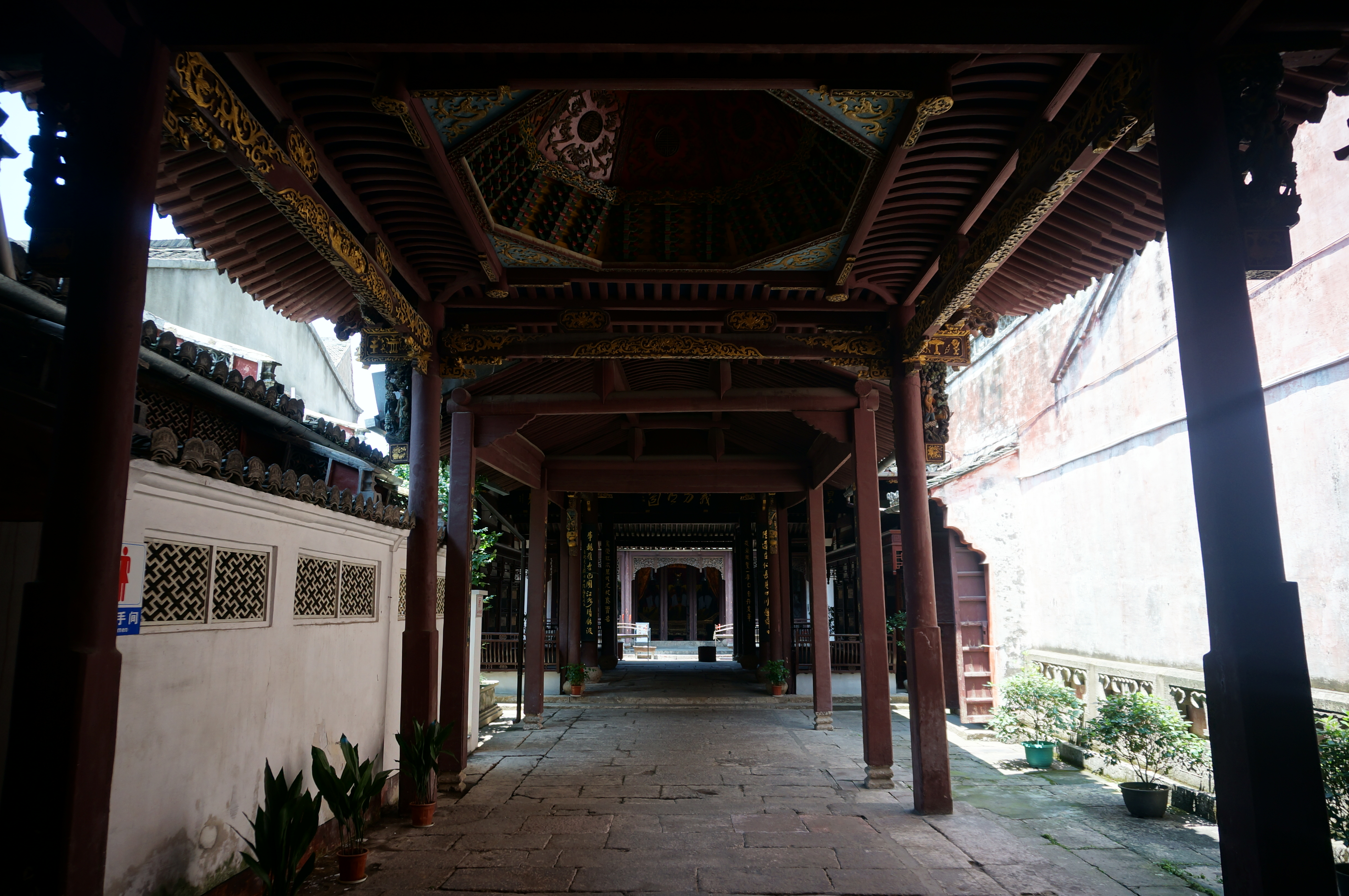
The Southern Axis of the Corridor

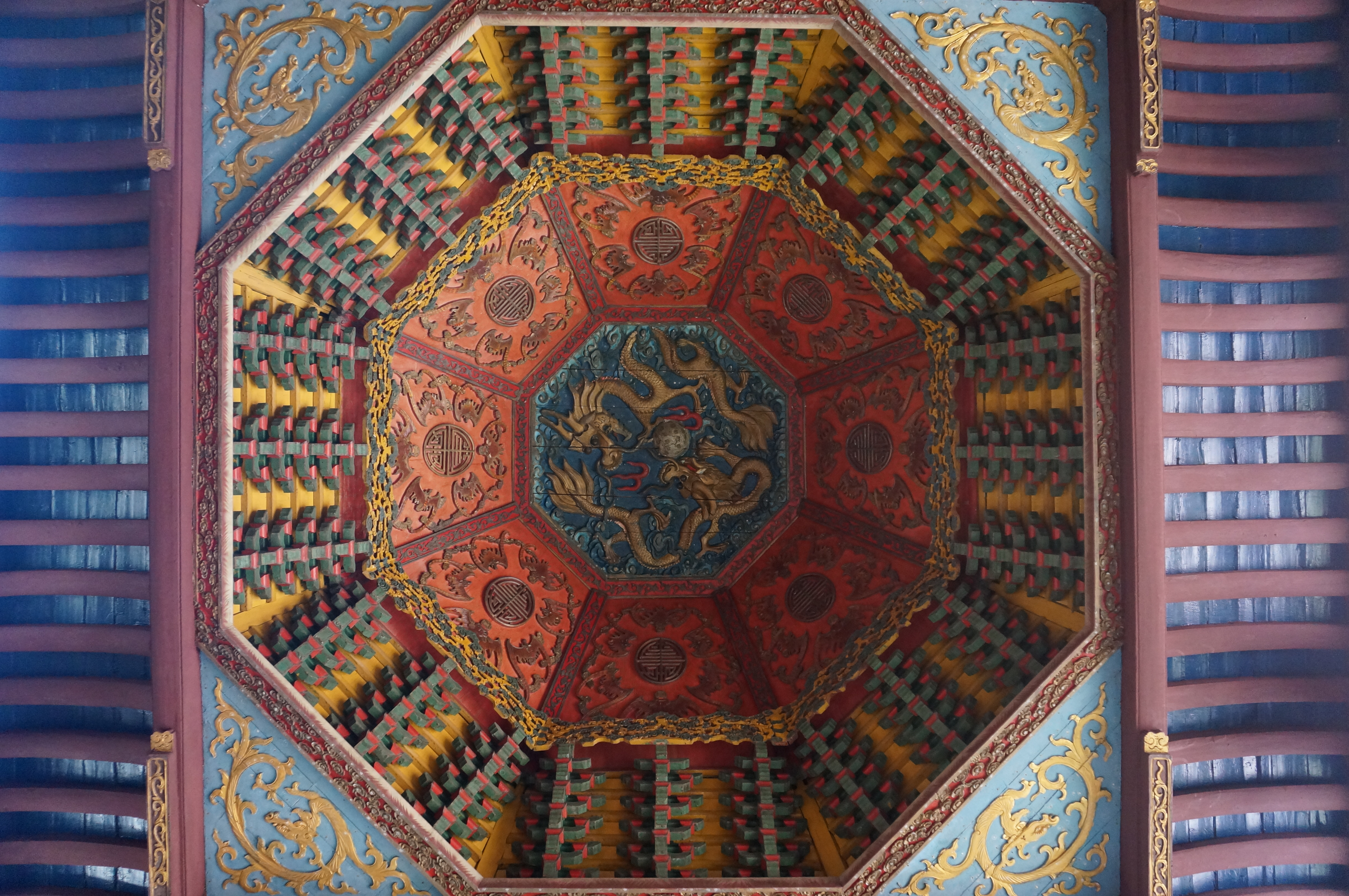
A well on the corridor

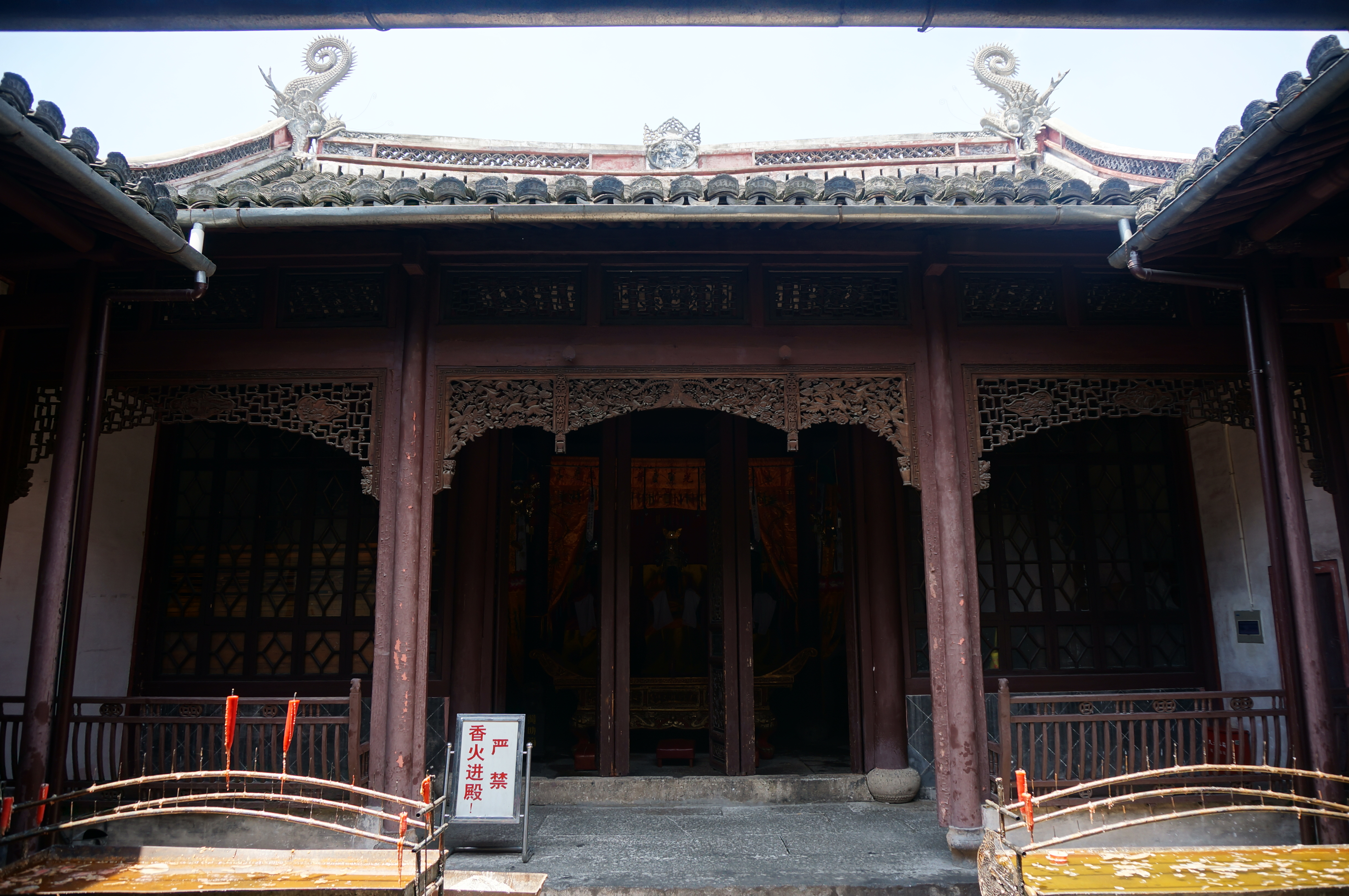
Yan Wang Hall on the Southern Axis

== References and notes ==
Website

- "Official website of the Cao'e Temple". Archived from the original on 2013-08-13.
