= Zu Taizhi zhiguai =

Collection of stories compiled by Zu Taizhi

Zu Taizhi zhiguai (Chinese: 祖台之志怪; trans. "Ghost Stories by Zu Taizhi" or "Account of Anomalies by Zu Taizhi" or "Zu Taizhi's Records of the Strange", etc.") or shortly Zhiguai 志怪, is an early collection of fantastic stories (of the zhiguai xiaoshuo genre) compiled by the scholar Zu Taizhi (祖台之, courtesy name (zi): Yuanchen 元臣) during the Eastern Jin period (317–420). The work spans two scrolls (juan) and features accounts of miraculous events, supernatural phenomena, and individuals with magical powers, including historical figures such as Dongfang Shuo (东方朔), Zhang Hua (张华), and Tao Kan (陶侃). Some stories depict romantic relationships between ghosts and humans, for example in the tales Chen Kui (陈夔) and Lushan furen (庐山夫人).

The language of the collection is noted for its richness and elegance. Although the work was mostly lost shortly after its compilation, the Republican-era scholar Lu Xun (鲁迅) reconstructed 15 surviving fragments in his collection Gu xiaoshuo gouchen (古小說鉤沉). Additional smaller fragments are preserved in the collections Shuofu (说郛) and Gujin shuobu congshu (古今说部丛书).

The Hanyu da zidian f.e. uses the edition of the Gujin shuobu congshu.

== Bibliography ==
- Li Xueqin 李学勤, and Lü Wenyu 吕文郁 (eds.): Siku da cidian 四庫大辭典. Changchun: Jilin daxue chubanshe, vol. 2, p. 2167 f.
- Hanyu da zidian. 1993 (one-volume edition)
