= Tadpole script =

Zhou period Chinese scripts

- Languages: Chinese language

Tadpole script or Kedou (蝌蚪文, “蝌蚪书”、“蝌蚪篆”) is a variety of Chinese seal script.

Traditionally the origin is said to be that tadpole script manuscripts were first discovered when the house of Confucius was pulled down in the second century. The name comes from the tadpole-shape with big heads and tails of the characters. It was distinct from the insect script. However "tadpole script" can simply be a popular way of referring to the ancient script of the Chou period.
