= Cao E =

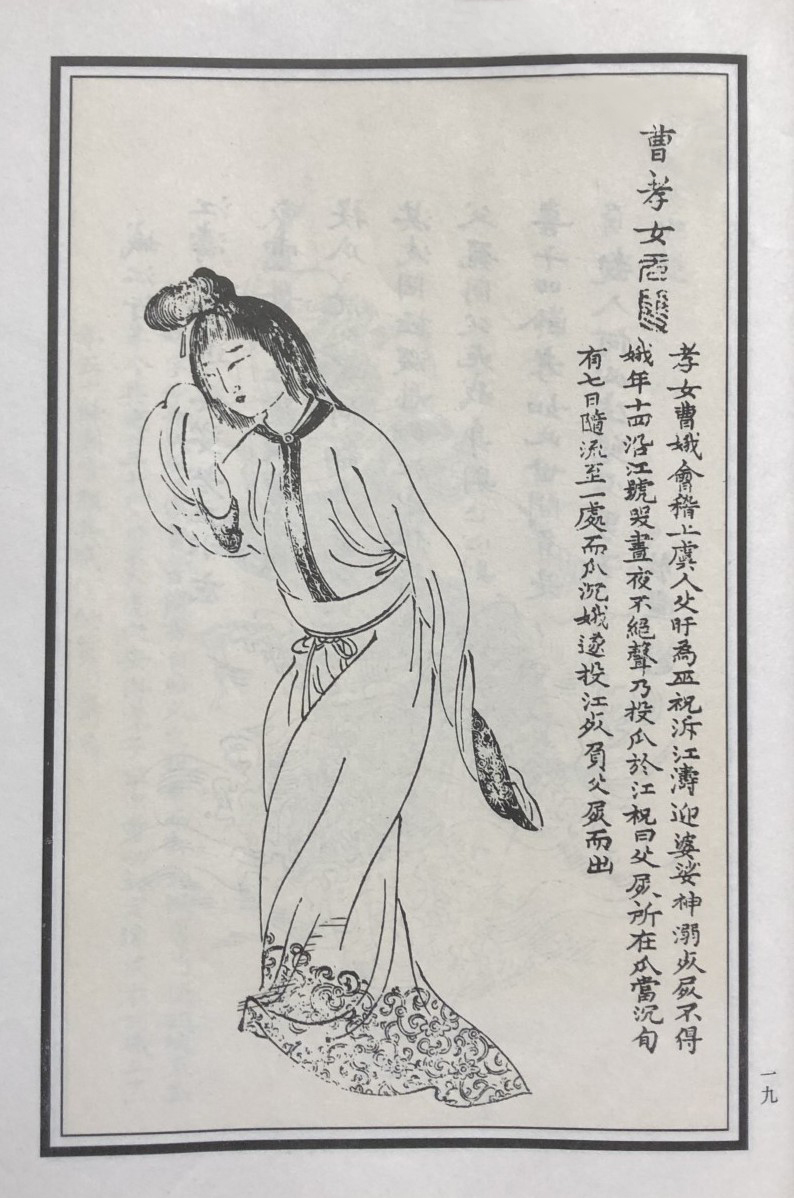
- Cao E (曹娥) as depicted in the Wu Shuang Pu (無雙譜, Table of Peerless Heroes) by Jin Gulian
- Chinese: 曹娥
Transcriptions
Standard Mandarin
- Hanyu Pinyin: Cáo É
- Bopomofo: ㄘㄠˊㄜˊ
- Wade–Giles: Ts`ao O
Yue: Cantonese
- Jyutping: Cou^{4} Ngo^{4}

Cao Xiaonü (posthumous name)
- Chinese: 曹孝女
- Literal meaning: Cao Filial piety daughter
Transcriptions
Standard Mandarin
- Hanyu Pinyin: Cáo Xiàonǚ
- Bopomofo: ㄘㄠˊㄒㄧㄠˋㄋㄩˇ
- Wade–Giles: Ts'ao Hsiao-nu
Yue: Cantonese
- Jyutping: Cou^{4} Haau^{3}pou^{2}

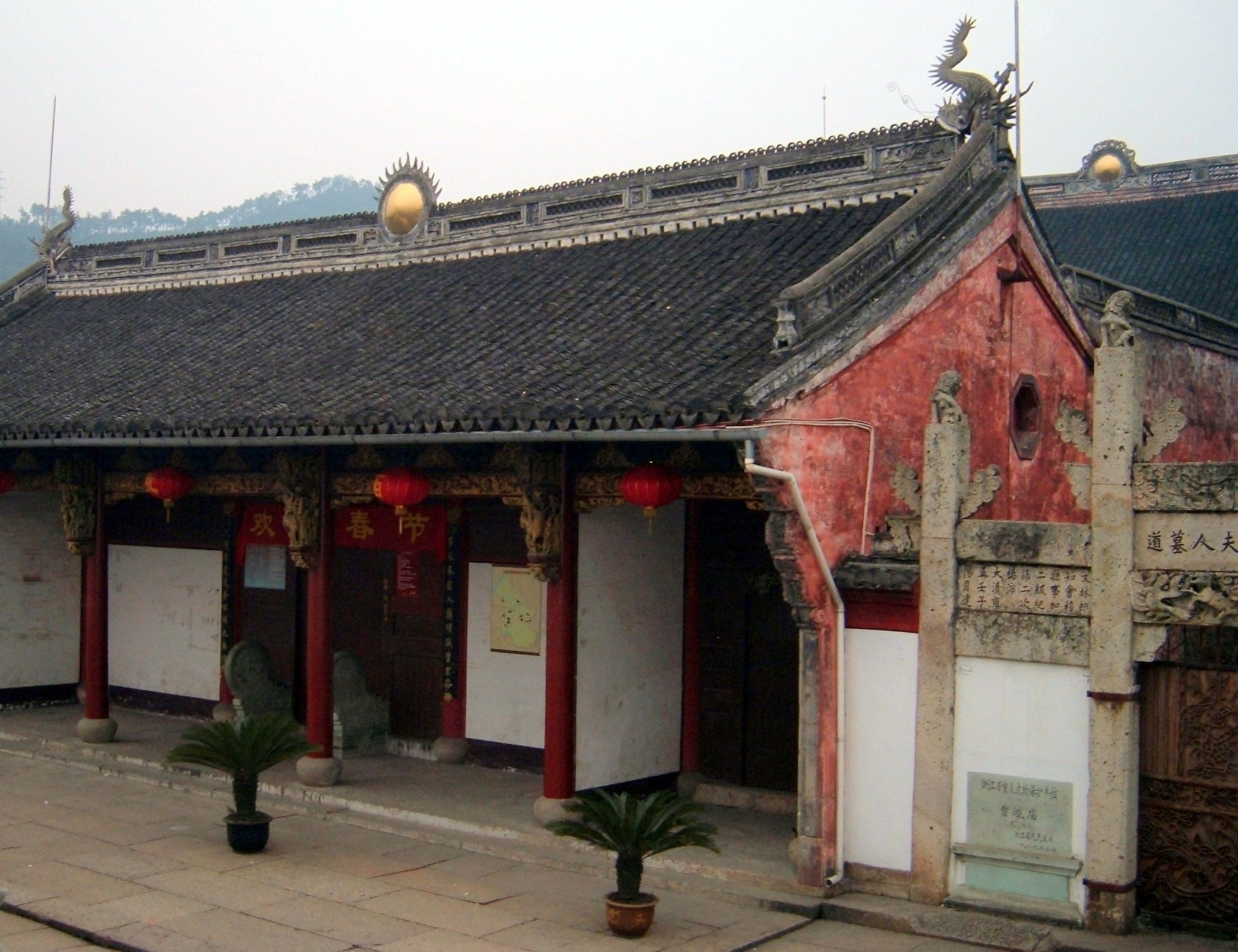
Cao'e Temple from the east, looking over the Cao'e Rivier

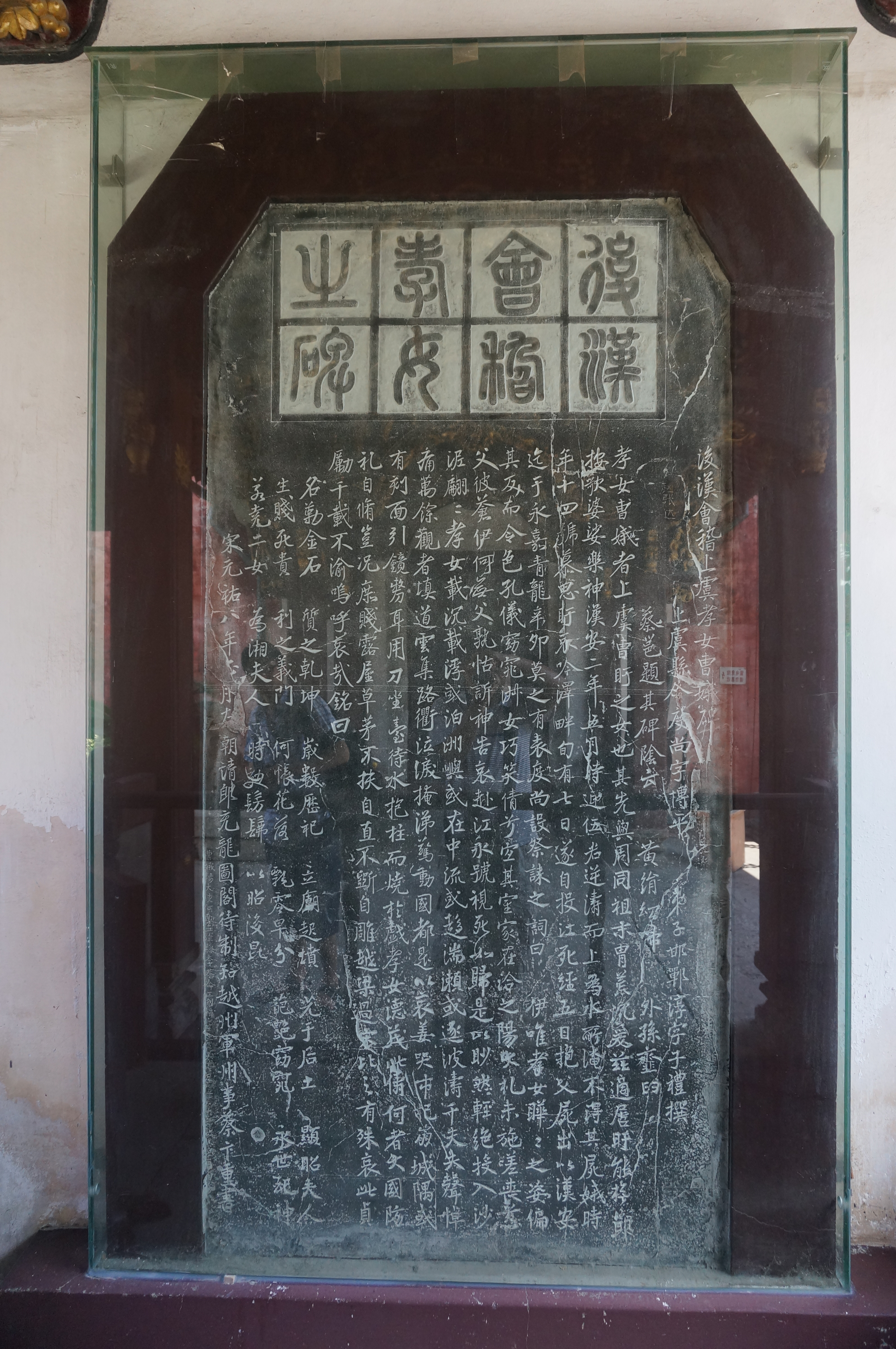
Cao'e-stele from the year 1093, made by Cai Bian (蔡卞). This monument measures 2 meters in height and is 1 meter wide.

Cao E (Chinese: 曹娥; pinyin: Cáo É) (130–143) was a young girl from Shangyu District, Shaoxing, Zhejiang Province in China. She was the daughter of the shaman Cao Xu. The girl died in the year 143 while trying to save her father from drowning. In the year 151 a temple was built for her and the river in which she and her father drowned, was named after her.

== Life ==
Cao Xu (曹盱) was the father of Cao E. He was a shaman who led local ceremonies at Shangyu. At the ceremony of the Dragon Boat Festival in the year 143, Cao Xu fell into the Shun river. A large-scale search was launched that lasted 17 days, but yielded nothing. Cao E, his daughter of 13 years old, decided in the course of filial piety (孝, xiao) to search for her father in the river. After five days, she appeared above water with her father in her arms, both dead from drowning. This act made Cao E a very famous girl, a textbook example of filial piety. The veneration of the girl started right away; from that moment on, she received the courtesy name 曹孝女 (Cao Xiaonü; Cao, the filial piety daughter). Eight years later, in 151, a temple and a tomb were built in memory of Cao E in honor of her sacrifice to save her father. A stone stele was made to honor her memory, but it has been lost. In 1093, Cai Bian (蔡卞) made a similar stele for her. The Shun River was renamed the Cao'e River in her honor.

== Things named after Cao E ==
=== Cao'e River ===
The Cao'e River arises at an altitude of 870 meters on the Jiangongling mountain in the Dapan Mountains in the province of Zhejiang in China. The river is 182.4 km long and flows into the Hangzhou Bay. The river has had several names such as, Shun river, named after Emperor Shun and Shangyu river, named after the region it flows through. The name the river still bears today is from the girl Cao E (130-143), who drowned in that river along with her father.

=== Cao'e Temple ===
The Cao'e Temple was first built in 151, after which the temple was rebuilt many times. The last time the temple was rebuilt was after a major fire in 1929, the reconstruction then lasted until 1936. The construction was made with a lot of wood carving in addition to the stone carving. The temple stands in the Shangyu District, Shaoxing, Zhejiang and its façade faces east and overlooks the Cao'e-river, the other side has a view on the Phoenix mountain. The land on which the temple stands has an area of 6000 square meters, the temple has an area of 3840 square meters. Since 1989, the Cao'e-temple has been included in the list of protected national and cultural relics. Inside the temple, several wall paintings have been created describing the story of Cao E. Every year from May 15-22, there is a festival in the Cao'e-temple, with a Cao E memorial service at the temple on May 22. The temple is called the number one temple of Jiangnan.

=== Cao'e Tomb ===
The Cao'e Tomb has been destroyed and rebuilt a few times after its construction in 151. The current tomb is 2.7 meters high and measures 7 meters wide and deep and is placed in the northern part of the Cao'e-temple.

=== Cao'e Stele ===
The original Cao'e Stele (曹娥碑) was lost but in 1093, Cai Bian (蔡卞) crafted another stele for Cao E, this stele is over 2 meters high and 1 meter wide. The Cao'e Stele is set up in the Cao'e Temple. The stele has been titled "The stele of Cao E, the filial piety daughter". This stele has become a historical monument.

=== Small Cao E town ===
Xiaocao'ezhen, English: "Small Cao E town" (小曹娥镇; xiǎo Cáo É zhèn), is named after Cao E and is part of Yuyao (Ningbo) in the Zhejiang province, China. Small Cao E town has an area of 33.4 square kilometers and a population of 40,400 (2017). There is a Cao'e-post-office, Cao'e-health-center, Cao'e-school and Cao'e-supermarket in the town. The town is located about 50 km away from the port of Ningbo and is known for its industry. Small Cao E town has a reputation for honey and mustard. Small Cao E town has been chosen as one of the 1000 top towns in China.

=== Cao E tribute ===
- There are more than 30 steles donated by famous people and exhibited in the temple in honor of Cao E, some of these famous people are: Mi Fu, Tang Yin, Zhu Yunming, Wen Zhengming, Chiang Kai-shek.
- Over time, a number of dignitaries have visit the temple of Cao E.
- A number of dignitaries have invested in the temple, for example, in 1093 Emperor Song Zhezong had a main hall built in the temple.
- Poems have been written for Cao E by famous people, including Xu Wei, Yu Youren, Xiong Xiling, Ju Zheng, Liu Chunlin, Wang Ruan, Wang Zhen.
- Several writers incorporated Cao E's story into their own works, including Luo Guanzhong, Cao Xueqin.
- Cao E is included in the Book of the Later Han.
- Cao E is included in the Wu Shuang Pu (無雙譜; Book of Peerless Heroes) by Jin Guliang.
