= Pitch-pot =

Traditional Chinese game

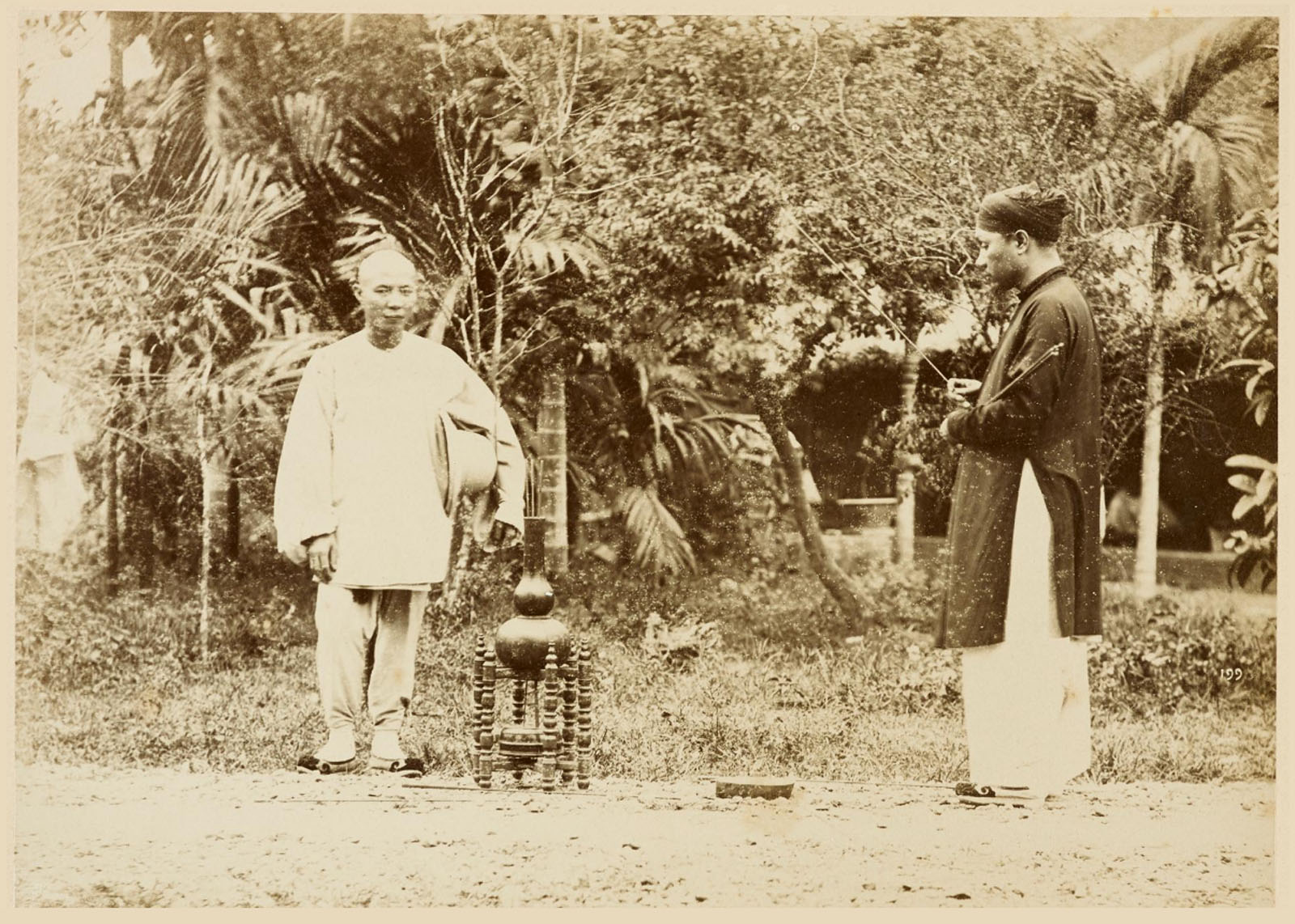
- A Chinese (left) and Vietnamese (right) person participating in the traditional game of pitch-pot.

Chinese name
- Traditional Chinese: 投壺
- Simplified Chinese: 投壶
Transcriptions
Standard Mandarin
- Hanyu Pinyin: tóuhú
- Wade–Giles: t'ou-hu

Japanese name
- Kanji: 投壺
- Kana: とうこ
Transcriptions
- Revised Hepburn: tōko

Korean name
- Hangul: 투호
- Hanja: 投壺
Transcriptions
- Revised Romanization: tuho
- McCune–Reischauer: t'uho

Vietnamese name
- Vietnamese alphabet: đầu hồ
- Chữ Hán: 投壺

Pitch-pot (simplified Chinese: 投壶; traditional Chinese: 投壺) is a traditional Chinese game that requires players to throw arrows or sticks from a set distance into a large, sometimes ornate, canister.

The game had originated by the Spring and Autumn and Warring States periods of China, probably invented by archers or soldiers as a pastime during idle periods. The game began as a game of skill or a drinking game at parties, but by the time it was described in a chapter of the Chinese Classic Book of Rites, it had acquired Confucian moral overtones. Initially popular among elites, it spread to other classes and remained popular in China until the end of the Qing dynasty. During this time it also spread to Korea, Japan and Vietnam.

== Rules ==
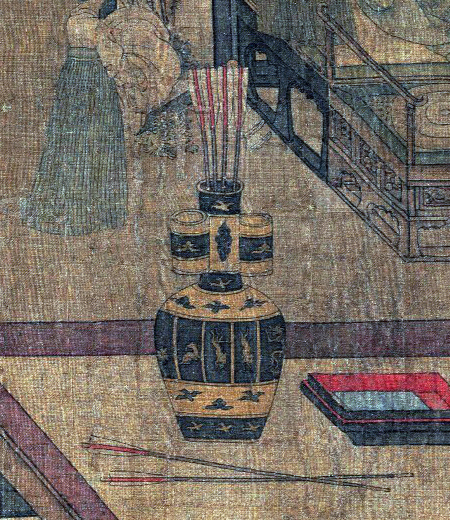
Pitch-pot with arrows, detail from a painting by Zhou Wenju. Southern Tang dynasty, 10th century.

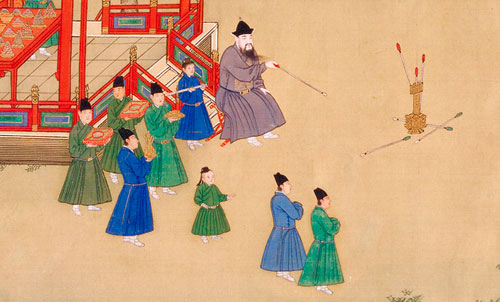
The Xuande Emperor playing touhu. Ming dynasty, 15th century.

In the Book of Rites, it is written that "a pitcher is a ritual for the host to discuss his talents with his guests over a swallowed drink. The book also records the rules and methods of throwing bottles in the pre-Qin period. The rules and rituals of the game were elaborate, with the hosts and guests having to give way three times before the game could be played. The guests, including the attendants, are bound by the rules of etiquette.

Utensils

- A wide belly, long neck, and narrow, slightly open mouth, with two small ears on the outside of the neck. The belly is five inches long (about twelve centimetres) and the neck seven inches long (about sixteen centimetres). The full height is 1 foot 2 inches (about 28 centimetres), and the mouth is 2½ inches (just under 6 centimetres) in diameter.
- The arrows are of three types, none of which have tips, and all of which are an eighth of an inch in circumference (less than about two centimetres).
  - For indoor pitchers: 2 feet long (about 46 centimetres)
  - For a hall pitcher: 2 feet 8 inches long (about 65 centimetres)
  - For outdoor use: 3 feet 6 inches long (about 83 centimetres)

Middle: scoring bucket.

- Counting: scoring stick, 1 foot 2 inches (about 28 centimetres) long.

Passage

- Before the game, the host kindly invites the guest to play, and the guest must decline twice. Only after the host has invited the guest a third time can the guest participate.
- At the start of the game, the host stands on the left and the guest on the right, and starts throwing at a distance of two and a half arrows from the bottle.
  - The guest stands on the right, two and a half arrows away from the bottle. Those in lowly positions are required to hold their arrows on their bodies.
  - Each arrow is scored by the master of ceremonies (the master of ceremonies), who is standing at the side of the bottle, and the 'count' is placed in the 'centre'.
    - The first arrow to be thrown is worth 10 points. The first arrow is called the 'first'.
    - The second arrow is scored for 5 points.
    - The third arrow is worth 5 points.
    - The fourth arrow has 20 points. The fourth arrow is called "Yuijin".
    - If the first arrow does not go in, but the second, third and fourth arrows all go in: one point is added. This is called a 'loose arrow'.
    - If an arrow does not enter the bottle, it is called a 'leaning arrow' and is not scored.
    - If the end of the arrow enters the bottle, it is called a 'backwards hit' and is not scored.
  - After the four arrows have been thrown, the moderator begins to count the total number of points. The master of ceremonies then announces the winner of the game, and then the celebrant announces the penalty.
- After the end of the round: the waiter (sous-videur) pours the wine and the winner gives the wine to the loser, who has to admit the penalty and kneel down to accept the wine.
- End: Two winners in three rounds and the winner appears. The celebrant announces the winner. The crowd drinks a celebratory toast. The MC then announces the end of the game.

== In Korea ==
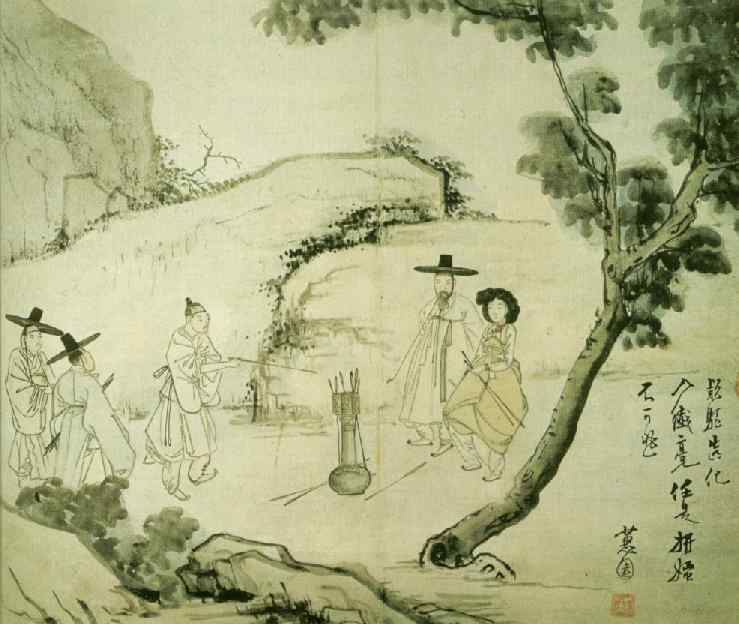
"Playing Tuho under the Trees" (임하투호; 林下投壺; Imha Tuho) from the Hyewon Pungsokdo album of genre paintings by 19th-century Korean painter Hyewon

Tuho appears to have come to Korea from China during the Goryeo period, in 1116 CE, and was popularised by King Yejong. The king's patronage made the previously banned game into a popular courtly pastime, until the influence of the Yuan dynasty once again diminished tuho's popularity.

In the fifteenth century, the Joseon dynasty revived the game at court, promulgating it as a creation of Confucianism. It was defended from criticism by King Jungjong in 1518, who reaffirmed its respectability and its Confucian connotations. Popularity at court enabled the game to spread through the scholarly and lay community, although the Sarim scholars of the Late Joseon period dismissed it as frivolous. Despite this tuho was a favourite pastime of the scholar Yi Hwang, who recommended it to his students as a way to develop physical health and mental focus. Tuho was featured (along with Yi Hwang) on the 1000 won note from 1983 to 2002, but was left off of the newest version of the 1000 won note which was first issued January 22, 2007. It was also recommended by Chŏng Yagyong, in his Mongmin Simsŏ ("Admonitions on Governing the People").

Arrow vases sometimes feature in the sculptural imagery of norigae accessories, where they symbolise the rejection of bad fortune.

Nowadays, the game is a traditional diversion on Korean New Year's Day and Chuseok. Modern versions are often played with a simple canister and rubber-tipped arrows. The arrows used are usually between 50 and 60 cm long, and are thrown at the arrow vase from around ten paces away. Tuho was also a popular drinking game. For every arrow that missed the pot, the loser or bulseung (불승/不承, lit. no-success) had to take a drink. To prevent betting on the outcome, losers could opt to sing a song as a penalty instead. Players who did not miss the canister were called hyeon (현, lit. wise).

== Gallery ==
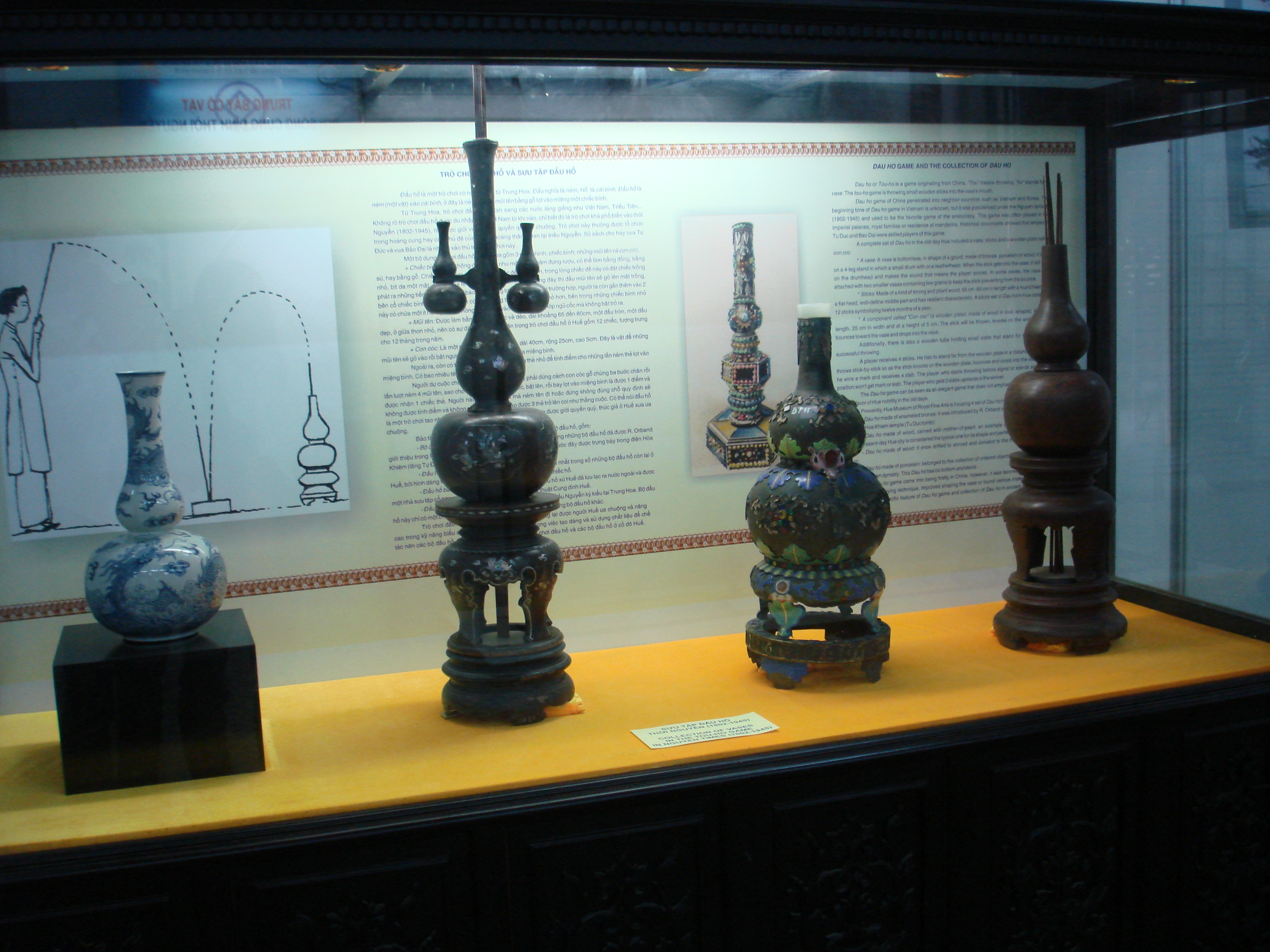
Vietnamese đầu hồ (pitch-pot)

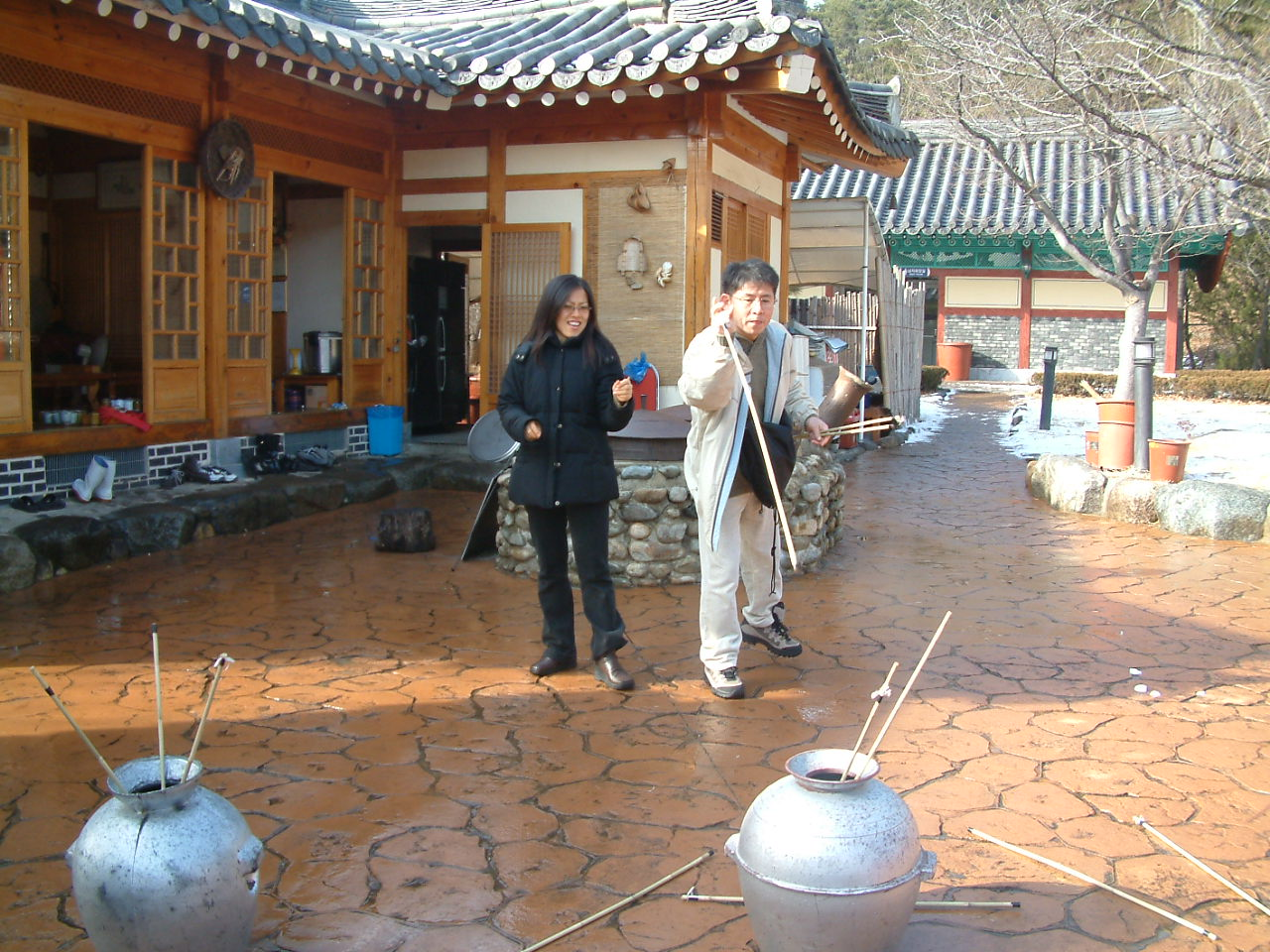
Koreans playing tuho

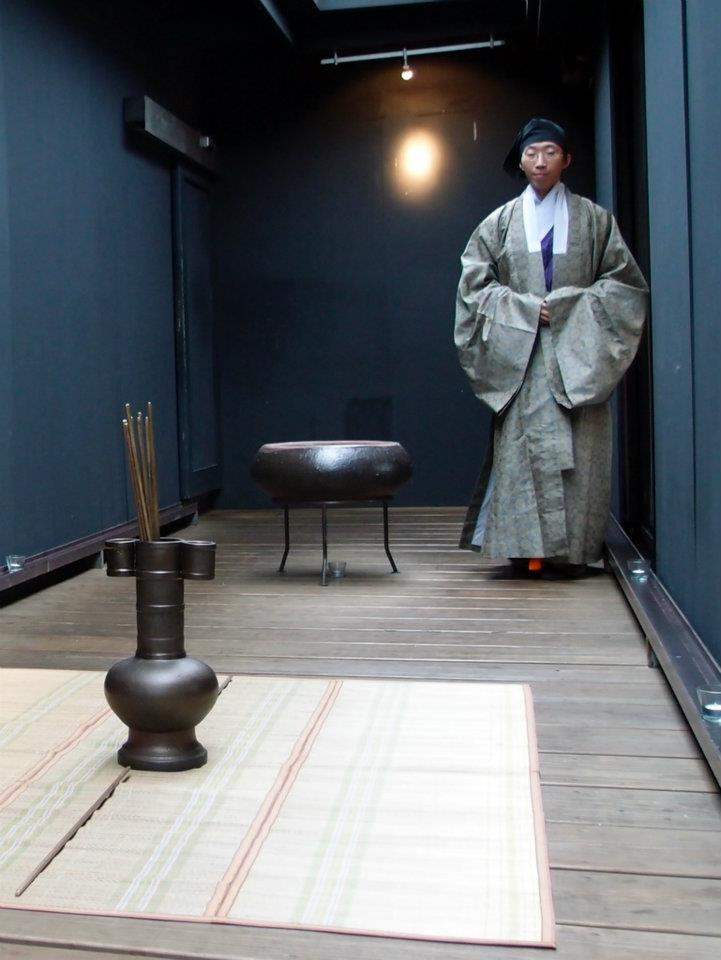
Modern Chinese person playing pitch-pot, wearing Hanfu

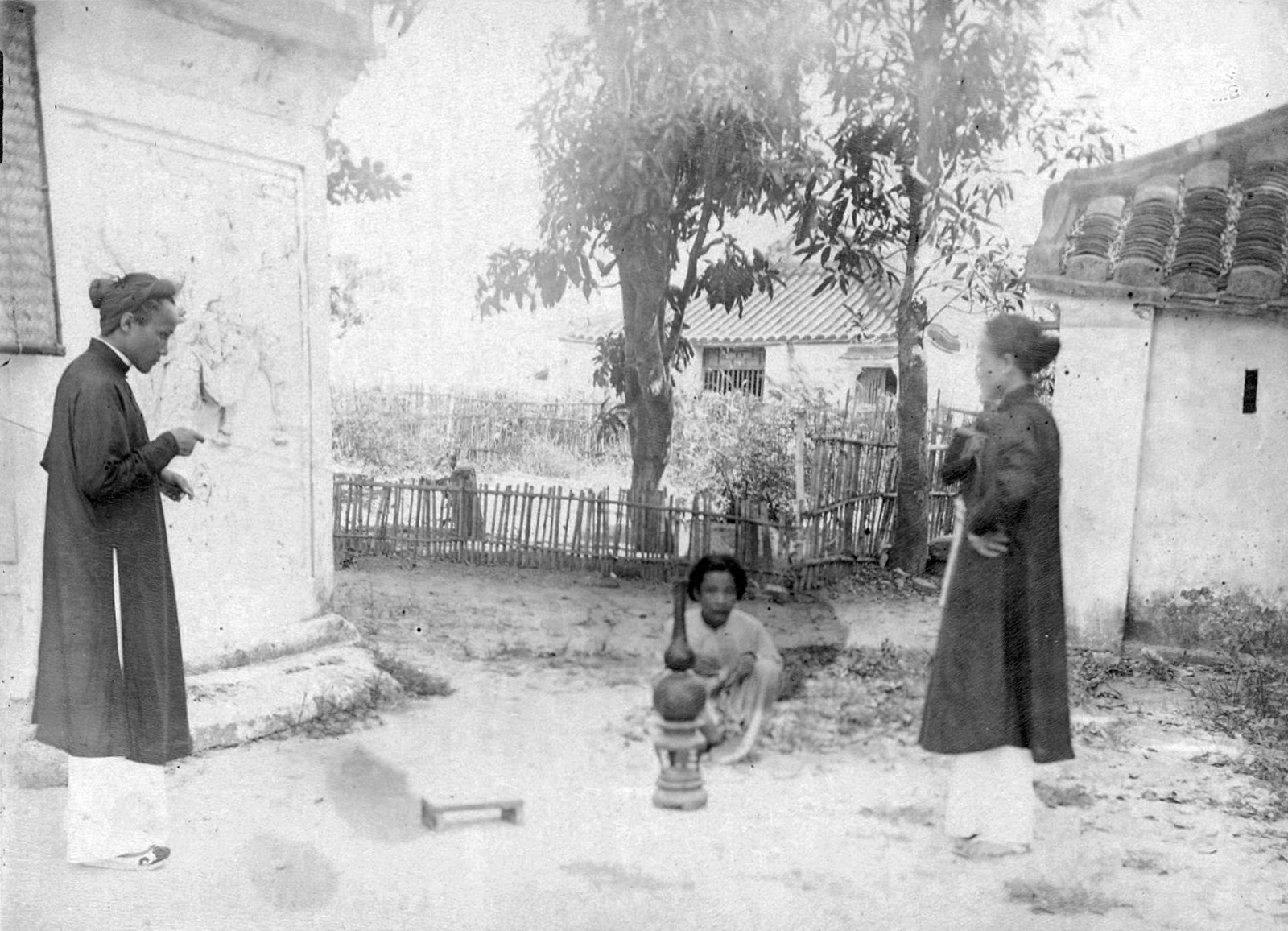
Vietnamese playing pitch-pot.

== See also ==
- Archery
