= Seleucus =

Seleucus or Seleukos (Ancient Greek: Σέλευκος) was a Macedonian Greek name, possibly meaning "very bright" or “very white”. It is likely related to the ancient name Zaleucus (Ancient Greek: Ζάλευκος). Seleucus may refer to:

== People of the Seleucid Empire ==
- Seleucus I Nicator (Satrap 311–305 BC, King 305 BC–281 BC), general of Alexander the Great, son of Antiochus and founder of the Seleucid Empire
- Seleucus II Callinicus (246–225 BC), ruler of the Seleucid Empire
- Seleucus III Ceraunus (or Soter) (225–223 BC), ruler of the Seleucid Empire, son of Seleucus II
- Seleucus IV Philopator (c. 218–175 BC), ruler of the Seleucid Empire
- Seleucus V Philometor (died 125 BC), ruler of the Seleucid Empire for a short time
- Seleucus VI Epiphanes (between 124 and 109–94 BC), King of Syria
- Seleucus VII Philometor (died c. 57 BC?), possibly ruler of the Seleucid Empire, but his existence is disputed
- Seleucus, probable name of the father of Antiochus (father of Seleucus I Nicator)
- Seleucus, a son of Antiochus I Soter and grandson to Seleucus I
- Seleucus, one of the sons of Antiochus VII Sidetes and Cleopatra Thea
- Seleucus (commandant), in 30 BC commandant of the eastern Egyptian border fortress Pelusium

== Other people ==
- Seleucus, son of Bithys (died c. 130 BC), Ptolemaic governor of Cyprus and admiral
- Seleucus of Alexandria, Greek grammarian and sophist in the ancient Roman era
- Seleucus of Seleucia (c. 190–150 BC), Hellenistic astronomer and philosopher born in the Seleucid Empire
- Seleucus (son of Ablabius), 4th century rhetorician and friend of Roman emperor Julian the Apostate
- Seleucus (praetorian prefect), 4th-5th century Christian Roman senator and praetorian prefect
- Seleucus (Roman usurper) (fl. 221), usurper against Emperor Elagabalus

== See also ==
- Zaleucus, 7th century BC Greek who probably devised the first written European law code
