= Charito =

Roman empress from 363 to 364

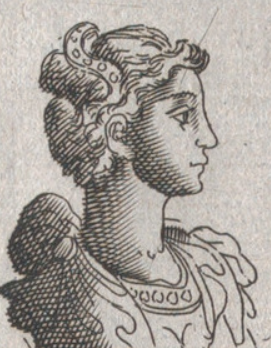
- Imaginary portrait (1587)

Empress of the Roman Empire
- Tenure: June 363 – February 364
- Spouse: Jovian
- Issue: Varronianus
- Father: Lucillianus

Charito (flourished mid-4th century AD) was a Roman Empress, consort of Jovian, Roman Emperor. Some historians doubt whether Charito was granted the title of Augusta as no archaeological evidence as yet confirms it.

== Name ==
Charito's name does not appear in Ammianus Marcellinus, one of the main sources for the reign of her husband. The earliest source recording her name appears to be the "Chronographikon syntomon" of Nikephoros I of Constantinople. The earliest Latin source doing so was a translation of the chronographikon by Anastasius Bibliothecarius. Timothy Barnes considers her absence from the account of Ammianus to reflect her lack of political influence. Barnes notes that Ammianus does not name Albia Dominica, wife of Valens, whose influence was also limited.

== Family ==
According to Ammianus and Zosimus, Charito was a daughter of Lucillianus. Lucillianus was a military commander situated in Sirmium during the late reign of Constantius II. He had served as a commander in a conflict with the Sassanid Empire in 350. He then served as comes domesticorum under Constantius Gallus.

In 358-359, Lucillianus and Procopius formed the second embassy sent by Constantius to Shapur II, negotiating terms of peace and returning without results. Lucillianus later attempted to counter the advance of Julian and his forces against Constantius. He was defeated however and was dismissed from the Roman army when Julian rose to the throne.

Ammianus and Zosimus give two slightly different accounts on the role of the imperial father-in-law in the brief reign of Jovian. Lucillianus was reinstated and received orders to move to Mediolanum. In secret, Jovianus also asked him to "take with him some men selected for their tried vigour and loyalty, with the view of making use of their support as the condition of affairs might suggest".

The return of Lucillianus to action would result in his death sometime later. He was killed by his own men after a false rumour indicated that Julian was still alive.

According to Zosimus, Lucillianus was murdered for being the bearer of the bad news about the death of Julian. The two accounts differ in the location of the death, Rheims or Sirmium, and on which units were responsible. Ammianus leaves it vague while Zosimus points at specific units.

== Empress ==
Charito married Jovian, a son of Varronianus. Her father-in-law was tribune of the Jovians and comes domesticorum. Varronianus retired into private life during the reign of Julian. Jovian had also pursued a military career, serving as primicerius domesticorum under Julian. They had at least one son, also named Varronianus. Philostorgius claims that Varronianus was one of two sons. The other son is not named. However this brief mention is the only source mentioning or suggesting the existence of a second son.

On 26 June 363, Julian was mortally wounded in the Battle of Samarra. He died a few hours following the end of the conflict. He was childless and had never designated an heir. On 27 June, the remaining officers of the campaign proceeded to elect a new emperor, selecting Jovian for unclear reasons. Charito became the new empress.

Jovianus and the younger Varronianus served as Roman Consuls in 364. The Dictionary of Christian Biography and Literature to the End of the Sixth Century by Henry Wace notes Charito and their son had joined the Emperor by the end of 363, a fact that can be determined by a passage of Themistius. But Joannes Zonaras reports that Charito and Jovian did not meet each other during his reign, a possible error according to the Dictionary. On 17 February 364, Jovian died at Dadastana and various accounts have survived debating the manner of his death. Ammianus, for instance, compares his death with that of Scipio Aemilianus and seems to have suspected murder.

Eutropius reports that Jovian "by the kindness of the emperors that succeeded him, was enrolled among the gods", which indicates the practice of the Imperial cult continued at least to this point in time. Zonaras reports both Jovian and Charito buried in the Church of the Holy Apostles, Constantinople.

== Widow ==
The History of the Decline and Fall of the Roman Empire by Edward Gibbon reports that:

The body of Jovian was sent to Constantinople, to be interred with his predecessors, and the sad procession was met on the road by his wife Charito, the daughter of Count Lucillian; who still wept the recent death of her father, and was hastening to dry her tears in the embraces of an Imperial husband. Her disappointment and grief were imbittered by the anxiety of maternal tenderness. Six weeks before the death of Jovian, his infant son had been placed in the curule chair, adorned with the title of Nobilissimus, and the vain ensigns of the consulship. Unconscious of his fortune, the royal youth, who, from his grandfather, assumed the name of Varronian, was reminded only by the jealousy of the government, that he was the son of an emperor. Sixteen years afterwards he was still alive, but he had already been deprived of an eye; and his afflicted mother expected every hour, that the innocent victim would be torn from her arms, to appease, with his blood, the suspicions of the reigning prince."

The reference to Varronianus being half-blind comes from the "Homilies on Philippians" by John Chrysostom. "Another again, his successor, was destroyed by noxious drugs, and his cup was to him no longer drink, but death. And his son had an eye put out, from fear of what was to follow, though he had done no wrong." Louis-Sébastien Le Nain de Tillemont was the first to identify the poisoned emperor with Jovian and the son with Varronianus. Gibbon and others have followed this interpretation. Tillemont assumed that Varronianus was eventually executed but there is no ancient or medieval text supporting the notion.

The reference to the fate of Charito comes from the "Letter to a Young Widow" by John Chrysostom, written c. 380.

"Now passing over ancient times, of those who have reigned in our own generation, nine in all, only two have ended their life by a natural death; and of the others one was slain by a usurper, one in battle, one by a conspiracy of his household guards, one by the very man who elected him, and invested him with the purple, and of their wives some, as it is reported, perished by poison, others died of mere sorrow; while of those who still survive one, who has an orphan son, is trembling with alarm lest any of those who are in power dreading what may happen in the future should destroy him, another has reluctantly yielded to much entreaty to return from the exile into which she had been driven by him who held the chief power."

The original passage is quite vague in not actually naming the emperors or empresses mentioned. The interpretation given by Gibbon and others identifies the two emperors who died of natural causes with Constantine I and Constantius II. The one slain by a usurper was Constans, assassinated by orders of rival emperor Magnentius. The one killed in battle is thought to be Constantine II. The one assassinated by his guards was Jovian, since Chrysostom expressed the same belief in another of his texts. The one killed by the man who elevated him to the purple was Constantius Gallus, created Caesar by Constantius II and later executed by orders of the same emperor. The empress trembling for the life of her son is thought to be Charito. The one returning from exile is tentatively identified with Marina Severa, first wife of Valentinian I and mother of Gratian. However the identification is very doubtful in this case as her life following her divorce is not recorded by other sources.

Bleterie considered Charito to have been a Christian and comments "no one had ever more need of the solid consolations which Christianity alone can give".

Royal titles
Preceded by Faustina	Roman empress consort 363–364	Succeeded by Marina Severa
