= Themistius =

Roman statesman, rhetorician and philosopher (317–c.388)

- Θεμίστιος
- Born: 317; Paphlagonia (modern-day Turkey)
- Died: c. 388; Constantinople (modern-day Istanbul, Turkey)
- Office: Prefect of Constantinople

Themistius (Ancient Greek: Θεμίστιος Themistios; 317 – c. 388 AD), nicknamed Euphrades (Εὐφραδής, "eloquent"), was a statesman, rhetorician and philosopher. He flourished in the reigns of Constantius II, Julian, Jovian, Valens, Gratian and Theodosius I, and he enjoyed the favour of all those emperors, notwithstanding their many differences and the fact that he himself was not a Christian. He was admitted to the senate by Constantius in 355, and he was prefect of Constantinople in 384 on the nomination of Theodosius. Of his many works, thirty-three orations of his have come down to us, as well as various commentaries and epitomes of the works of Aristotle.

== Early life ==
Themistius was born in Paphlagonia and taught at the Colchian Academy in Phasis. Several of his orations mention his father Eugenius, a distinguished philosopher from whom he received supplemental training. Themistius devoted himself chiefly to Aristotle, though he also studied Pythagoreanism and Platonism. His early commentaries on Aristotle were published without his consent and won him a high reputation. After passing his youth in Asia Minor and Syria, Themistius met Constantius II during the emperor's visit to Ancyra in Galatia in 347. On this occasion Themistius delivered his first extant oration, Peri Philanthropias.

== Career ==
It was not long after that he moved to Constantinople, where, apart from a short sojourn in Rome, he resided for the rest of his life. Themistius taught philosophy in the eastern capital for twenty years. In 355 he was inducted into the Senate of Constantinople, on the basis of a letter of recommendation from Constantius. The letter is still extant, and contains high praise both of Themistius and of his father Eugenius. Also preserved is Themistius' response, an oration of thanks delivered in the senate early in 356. In 357 he gave two further speeches honouring Constantius, although a state visit to Rome made the emperor unavailable to hear them in person. The orator was nonetheless rewarded with a bronze portrait statue. In 361 he was appointed to praetorian rank by a decree still extant. Themistius may have served as proconsul of Constantinople in 358; if so, he was the last to hold that office, before the position was elevated to the status of urban prefect.

Constantius died in 361; but Themistius, as a philosopher and pagan, naturally retained the favour of Julian, who spoke of him as the worthy senator of the whole world, and as the first philosopher of his age. The Suda states that Julian made Themistius prefect of Constantinople; but this is disproved by the speech delivered by Themistius, when he was really appointed to that office under Theodosius. Shortly before the death of Julian in 363, Themistius delivered an oration in honour of him, which is no longer extant, but which is referred to at some length by Libanius, in a letter to Themistius. In 364 he went, as one of the deputies from the senate, to meet Jovian at Dadastana, on the border of Galatia and Bithynia, and to confer the consulate upon him; and on this occasion he delivered an oration, which he afterwards repeated at Constantinople, in which he claims full liberty of conscience to practice any religion. In the same year he delivered an oration at Constantinople, in honour of the accession of Valentinian I and Valens, in the presence of the latter. His next oration is addressed to Valens, congratulating him on his victory over Procopius in June 366, and interceding for some of the rebels; it was delivered in 367. In the next year he accompanied Valens to the Danube in the second campaign of the Gothic war, and delivered before the emperor, at Marcianopolis, a congratulatory oration upon his Quinquennalia, 368. His next orations are to the young Valentinian II upon his consulship, 369, and to the senate of Constantinople, in the presence of Valens, in honour of the peace granted to the Goths, 370. On March 28, 373, he addressed to Valens, who was then in Syria, a congratulatory address upon the emperor's entrance on the tenth year of his reign. It was also while Valens was in Syria, that Themistius addressed to him an oration by which he persuaded him to cease from his persecution of the Catholic party. In addition to these orations, which prove that the orator was in high favour with the emperor, we have the testimony of Themistius himself to his influence with Valens.

In 377 he was in Rome, apparently on an embassy to Gratian, to whom he delivered an oration entitled Erotikos. On the association of Theodosius I in the empire by Gratian, at Sirmium, in 379, Themistius delivered an elegant oration, congratulating the new emperor on his elevation. Of his remaining orations some are public and some private; but few of them demand special notice as connected with the events of his life. In 384, (about the first of September), he was made prefect of Constantinople, an office which had been offered to him, but declined, several times before. He only held the prefecture a few months, as we learn from an oration delivered after he had laid down the office, in which he mentions, as he had done even six years earlier, and more than once in the interval, his old age and ill-health. From the thirty-fourth oration we also learn that he had previously held the offices of princeps senatus and praefectus annonae, besides his embassy to Rome; in another oration he mentions ten embassies on which he had been sent before his prefecture; and in another, composed probably about 387, he says that he has been engaged for nearly forty years in public business and in embassies. So great was the confidence placed in him by Theodosius, that, though Themistius was not a Christian, the emperor, when departing for the West to oppose Magnus Maximus, entrusted his son Arcadius to the tutorship of the philosopher, 387–388. Nothing is known about Themistius after this time; and he may have died around 388. Besides the emperors, he numbered among his friends the chief orators and philosophers of the age, Christian and pagan. Not only Libanius, but Gregory of Nazianzus also was his friend and correspondent, and the latter, in an epistle still extant, calls him the "king of arguments."

== Work ==
The orations of Themistius, extant in the time of Photius (9th century), were thirty-six in number. Of these, thirty-three have come down to us in Greek. Two of them, however, (Orations 23 and 33, and perhaps Oration 28) are not fully preserved, and one (Oration 25) is a brief statement, not a full oration. Modern editions of the Orations have thirty-four pieces, because a Latin address to Valens has been included as Oration 12. It is now believed though that this Latin address is a 16th-century creation. The final oration (Oration 34) was discovered as recently as 1816 by Angelo Mai in the Ambrosian Library at Milan. There are, in addition, a few other fragments which may come from lost Orations, as well as an additional work which survives in Syriac and another preserved in Arabic.

The philosophical works of Themistius must have been very voluminous; for Photius tells us that he wrote commentaries on all the books of Aristotle, besides useful abstracts of the Posterior Analytics, the books On the Soul, and the Physics, and that there were works of his on Plato; "and, in a word, he is a lover and eager student of philosophy." The Suda mentions his epitome of the Physics of Aristotle, in eight books; of the Prior Analytics, in two books; of the Posterior Analytics, in two books; of the treatise On the Soul, in seven books; and of the Categories in one book.

The epitomes which survive are:

- On the Posterior Analytics
- On the Physics
- On Aristotle's On the Soul
- On Aristotle's On the Heavens, in a Hebrew translation only
- On the Metaphysics 12, in a Hebrew translation only

In addition to these works, two surviving anonymous paraphrases were mistakenly attributed to him in the Byzantine era, and are now assigned to a Pseudo-Themistius:

- On the Prior Analytics
- On the Parva Naturalia

His paraphrases of Aristotle's Posterior Analytics, Physics and On the Soul are valuable; but the orations in which he panegyrizes successive emperors, comparing them to Plato's true philosopher, and even to the Idea itself, are intended to flatter. Boëthius describes him as, disertissimus (or diligentissimus) scriptor ac lucidus, et omnia ad facilitatem intelligentiae revocans.

In philosophy Themistius was an eclectic. He held that Plato and Aristotle were in substantial agreement, that God has made men free to adopt the mode of worship they prefer, and that Christianity and Hellenism were merely two forms of the one universal religion.

== Editions ==
- W. Dindorf edition of the orations (Leipzig, 1832): Themistii Orationes, ex codice Mediolanensi emendatae, a Guilielmo Dindorfio, Lipsiae: C. Cnobloch 1832.
- Schamp, Jacques, ed. (2023). Thémistios. Tome 2: Discours V-XIII: les empereurs illyrien et pannonien / Thémistios; textes établis, traduits et commentés par Jacques Schamp. Paris: Les Belles Lettres. ISBN 9782251006550.
- Themistii paraphrases Aristotelis librorum quae supersunt, ed. Leonhard von Spengel (Leipzig, 1866), Teubner series (reprinted 1998)

=== Translations ===
- Commentaire sur le traité de l'Âme d'Aristote, traduction de Guillaume de Moerbeke (Latin). Louvain, 1957
- Themistius on Aristotle On the Soul, trans. Robert B. Todd. London and Ithaca, 1996 (Ancient Commentators on Aristotle)
- Themistius on Aristotle Physics 1-3, trans. Robert B. Todd. London and Ithaca, 2011 (Ancient Commentators on Aristotle)
- Themistius on Aristotle's Physics 4, trans. Robert B. Todd. London and Ithaca, 2003 (Ancient Commentators on Aristotle)
- Themistius on Aristotle Physics 5-8, trans. Robert B. Todd. London, 2008 (Ancient Commentators on Aristotle)
- The Private Orations of Themistius, trans. R. Penella. Berkeley, 2000
- Ephesus, Michael of; Themistios (2020). On Aristotle: Nicomachean Ethics 10. Translated by Wilberding, James; Trompeter, Julia; Rigolio, Alberto. New York: Bloomsbury Academic. ISBN 978-1350170919. OCLC 1353217951. 276 pages.
