= Varronianus (son of Jovian) =

Varronianus (fl. 363 – 380) was the son of the emperor Jovian.

== Biography ==
Varronianus was the first of two sons born to the emperor Jovian and Charito, daughter of Lucillianus. Upon his father's accession to the imperial throne, Varronianus was given the title of Nobilissimus, and in 364, he was appointed consul alongside his father at Ancyra. As he was still an infant when his father died in 364, he was overlooked for the succession, and Valentinian I was elected instead.

It is possible that Varronianus was the young man referred to by John Chrysostom in two of his letters and homilies ("Homilies on Philippians" and "Letter to a Young Widow"). If so, it appears that Varronianus was still alive in 380, but was living in fear of his life, due to his imperial descent. At some point, he had one of his eyes removed, probably in an attempt to prevent him from making a claim to the throne.

== Sources ==
- Martindale, John R.; Jones, A. H. M.; Morris, John, eds. (1971). The Prosopography of the Later Roman Empire: Volume I, AD 260–395. Cambridge: Cambridge University Press. ISBN 0-521-07233-6.

Political offices
Preceded by Imp. Caesar D.N. Flavius Claudius Julianus Augustus IV, and Flavius Sallustius	Consul of the Roman Empire; 364 with D.N. Flavius Jovianus Augustus	Succeeded by Flavius Valentinianus Augustus, and Flavius Julius Valens Augustus
