= Amerias =

Lexicographer and linguist

Amerias (Greek: Ἀμερίας, 3rd century BC) was an ancient Macedonian lexicographer, known for his compilation of a glossary titled Glossai (Γλῶσσαι, terms or words). Αnother of his works was called Rhizotomikos (Ῥιζοτομικός), an etymological treatise.

Words of Amerias have survived in the writings of Hesychius and Athenaeus.

From the titles and the wording of Athenaeus, it is evident that Amerias did not write an exclusively Macedonian dictionary. He included in his Glossai a Homeric vocabulary as well, as with most of the Alexandrian grammarians. The only marked Macedonian term, given by Hesychius, is sauadai, saudoi, silenoi. Athenaeus calls him many times Amerias the Macedonian but it is Seleucus of Alexandria who is quoted with the Macedonian bread dramis, while Amerias in the same chapter is quoted with the bread ξηροπυρίτας, xeropyritas. The suffix -as indicates a Doric word, as badas and rhappaulas but they are not reported as Macedonian; they may be, they may be not. Words that resemble the Macedonian sound-law of Hesychius are: badas (Attic batalos), kalithos (Attic khalis), grabion and kalarrhugai, while Bathale, pekhari, scheron, tetholos, hyphainein, as well the suffix -thos of kalithos, contradict it.

In any case, since Amerias is the only ancient proper grammarian and lexicographer, who is quoted as Macedonian, his Glossary is regarded generally as Macedonian at least of the 4th to 3rd centuries BC.

== See also ==
- Ancient Macedonian language
