= Paulus Catena =

Roman notary

Paulus Catena ('the Chain' or 'the Fetter'; (Note: Catena, Paulus' cognomen, is usually translated as 'the Chain', but at least one source translates it as 'the Fetter.' Ammianus Marcellinus (the only ancient source to reference the name; see above) makes reference to both chains and fetters in his description of Paulus.) fl. 350s; d. 361/2 (Note: PLRE gives 361 or 362, Seeck gives 362, Smith 361.)) was a senior Roman public official who served as an investigator and notary for Constantius II during the mid-fourth century. He is principally known through the writings of Ammianus Marcellinus, though he is also present in the works of Libanius and Julian the Apostate. Marcellinus describes him as infamously cruel, and a skilled fabricator of false accusations.

== Biography ==
=== Background, reputation, and general character ===
Little is known of Paulus' personal life or background. He was a native of Spain (Note: Philostorgius calls him a Spaniard; Marcellinus in one place a native of Spain, in another a native of Dacia, though the PLRE states the latter reading is probably a textual corruption.) and Marcellinus reports that he had a "smooth countenance." Before obtaining his position as an imperial aid, he was a steward of the emperor's table. The exact office he held while in the emperor's service is unclear: Modern sources follow Marcellinus in calling him a notarius (notary) but Philostorgius calls him a clerk, and Marcellinus also alludes to him at one point holding a "receivership" in the provinces. Whatever his official title, his role in Constantius' service was multifaceted: he served as special investigator and judge in cases of suspected treason, "hatchet-man" in rooting out supporters of suppressed rebellions, and as one of Constantius' insiders in rival centers of political power.

The ancient sources assign Paulus a poor reputation and character. Julian calls him a notorious fabricator of false charges and asserts that he was "detested even while he flourished." Libanius also accuses him of prosecuting false charges, and says that "In Europe and in Asia he deserved to die thousands of times, so that those who knew the fellow were aggrieved that they could not put him to death over and over again." Marcellinus' account is particularly disparaging throughout. It is also the only source which mentions Paulus' cognomen 'Catena,' offering two accounts of how Paulus earned the name: in the first, Paulus is said to have earned the name on account of his skill in complex interrogations; in the second, on account of his skill in creating calumnies.

=== Activities ===
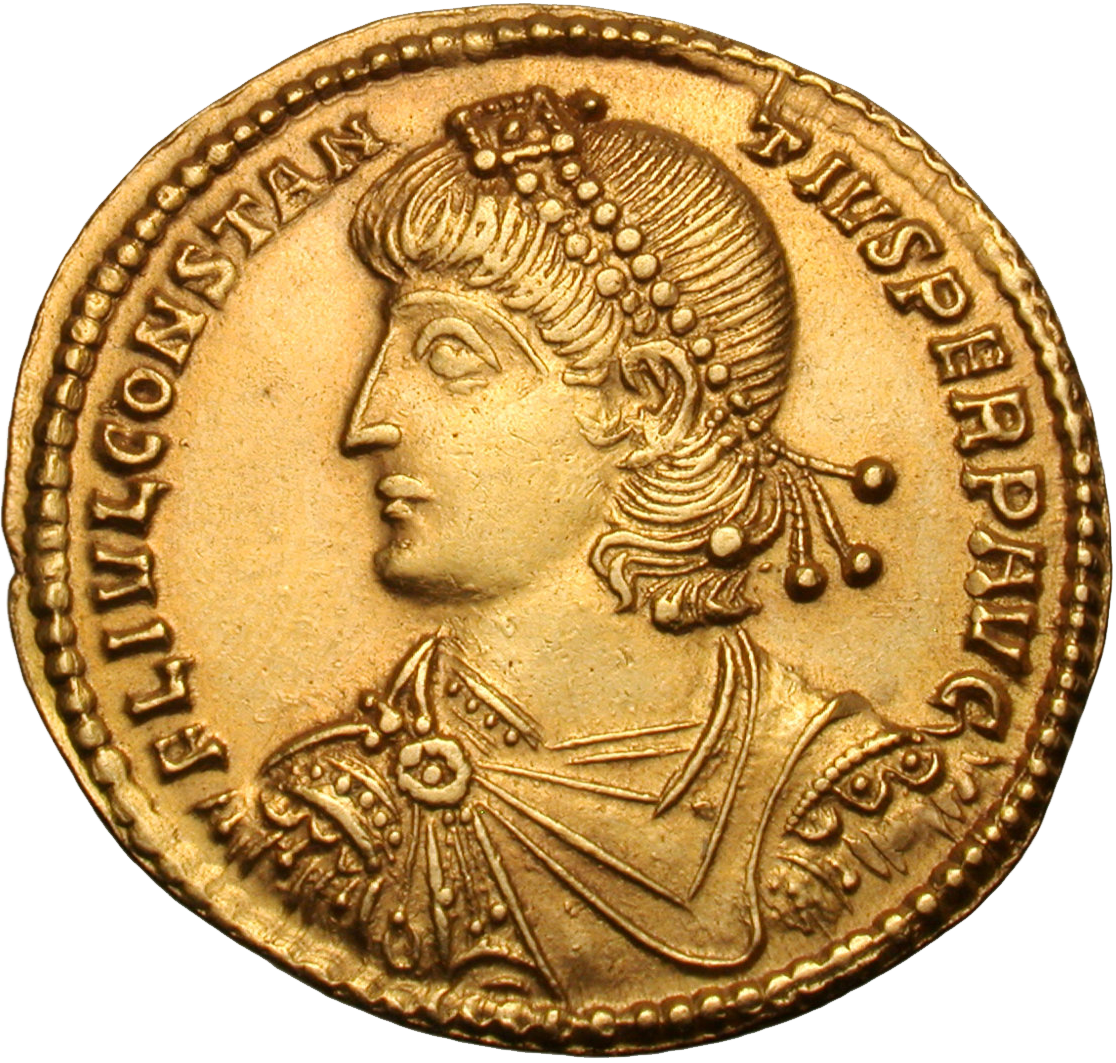
Medallion of Constantius II

In 353 he was dispatched to Britain by Constantius to arrest certain former supporters of the usurper Magnentius, who had been defeated earlier in the year. According to Marcellinus, once Paulus arrived, he widened his remit and began arresting other figures on entirely trumped-up charges. Marcellinus reports that Paulus' methods were so extreme and so unjust that eventually the vicarius of Britain, Flavius Martinus, although a loyal supporter of Constantius, intervened. Threatening to resign, he attempted to persuade Paulus to release the innocent prisoners he had taken, or at least to slow down his inquisitorial activity. Paulus refused. He turned on Martinus, falsely and publicly accusing him and other senior officers in Britain of treason and threatening to take them to the emperor's court in chains. In either desperation or rage, Martinus attacked Paulus with a sword. However, the attack failed and the vicarius committed suicide.

Paulus seems to have been involved in the fall of Constantius Gallus in 354, or perhaps merely in the trials that followed. Philostorgius adds that Paulus "had been one who had often displayed particular hostility to Gallus in his actions," though no details are known.

Following Marcellinus' account, Paulus was in Gaul in 355, rooting out supporters of the usurper Silvanus. He reportedly had several counts killed, and tortured at least one individual almost to death.

In the years between 355 and 359 Paulus' movements are not known. However, modern scholars argue that it is likely Paulus spent all or some of this time in Julian's court. Whether his role was as a spy for Constantius (as conjectured by Otto Seeck) or simply as a courtier is not known. Evidence for his presence in Julian's court comes from two sources: 1. In Julian's Letter to the Senate and People of Athens, he states that Constantius "hired [Paulus] to attack me." 2. In 358 Libanius wrote to Paulus, thanking him for urging Julian to write to him.

In 359, Paulus (accompanied by the comes Oreientis Modestus) was sent to the Roman East with general instructions to root out traitors and broad authority to conduct trials. Marcellinus adds that he was particularly interested in investigating certain parchment scrolls left in the temple of the oracle of Besa, bearing the prayers and wishes of supplicants. The historian implies that the real parchments were entirely inoffensive, but that they were incredibly easy to forge, and thus gave Paulus the ability to try and convict anyone. In any case, Paulus set up a court at Scythopolis and tried several people. He tried and convicted Aristophanes of Corinth (a friend of Libanius') of certain fiscal crimes. After Julian's ascension in 361, Libanius appealed to the emperor on behalf of Aristophanes. Julian granted a pardon to the man, clearing Aristophanes of, in Julian's words, all "the malicious charges of Paul."

On June 23, 359 Paulus appeared in Alexandria and acted with imperial authority to punish the opponents of Bishop George of Cappadocia. The Historia Acephala describes him publishing an imperial order, indicating the extent of his power in this period.

In late 361 or early 362, upon the ascent of Julian to the emperorship, Paulus was condemned to death by the Chalcedon tribunal. He was burned alive. It is possible that in prescribing this sentence (or perhaps in convicting Paulus at all), the commission was acting on Julian's explicit orders: Philostorgius reports that "[Julian sent Paulus] to Chalcedon, where he exacted satisfaction from [him]."

== Legacy ==
Paulus remains a minor character in the history of the Constantinian dynasty. Many scholars, including Gibbon, see him as an exemplification of Constantius' paranoid reign, and contend that Constantius bears the ultimate responsibility for Paulus' perversions of justice. Peter Crawford acknowledged that the emperor’s employment of officials like Paulus was "unscrupulous." Though few historical events can be definitively classified as results of Paulus' actions, Thomas Wright asserts that Paulus' destabilization of the Roman administration in Britain allowed the hostile Picts and Scots to invade and pillage Roman settlements.

== Sources ==
=== Ancient sources ===
- Ammianus Marcellinus, Res Gestae
  - Henderson, Jeffrey (ed.), Rolfe, J.C. (trans.), Ammianus Marcellinus: History. 3 Vols. Loeb ed. London: Heinemann, 1939–52. Online at LacusCurtius and Loeb Classics. Accessed 13 September 2022.
  - Yonge, Charles Duke (trans.), The Roman History of Ammianus Marcellinus During the Reigns of the Emperors Constantius, Julian, Jovianus, Valentinian, and Valens. London: G. Bell and Sons LTD, 1911. Online at Project Gutenberg. Accessed 13 September 2022.
- [Anonymous Annalist], Historia Acephala
  - Fromen, Heinz, Athanasii historia acephala. Westfälische Wilhelms-Universität Münster. 1914. Online at The Internet Archive. Accessed 13 September 2022.
  - Larsow, F., Die Fest-Briefe des Heiligen Athanasius, Bischofs von Alexandria. Leipzig, Göttingen; 1852, Online at Google Books and The Internet Archive. Accessed 13 September 2022.
  - Schaff, Philip; Wace, Henry (eds.), "Introduction. Historia Acephala and Festal Index" in Nicene and Post-Nicene Fathers; Volume 4: Athanasius: Select Works and Letters, Second Series. Hendrickson Publishers, Inc., originally published 1892 [ed. Archibald Robertson], reprinted June 1995. Online at The Internet Archive
- Julian
  - Letter to the Senate and People of Athens
    - Wright, Wilmer Cave (trans.), The Works of the Emperor Julian, Vol. 2. London: Heinemann, New York: Macmillan; 1913. Online at The Internet Archive and The Tertullian Project. Accessed 14 September 2022.
  - Letters (Epistulae)
    - Bidez, I., Cumont, F. (eds.), Imp. Caesaris Flavii Vlaudii Iuliani: Epistulae Leges Poematia Fragmenta Varia. Paris: Société D'édition «Les Belles Lettres», London: Milford, Oxford University Press; 1922. Online at The Internet Archive, Accessed 14 September 2022.
    - Heyler, Ludwig Henrich (ed. & trans.), Juliani Imperator quae Feruntur Epistolae. Moguntiae, 1828. Online at The Internet Archive and Google Books. Accessed 14 September 2022.
    - Wright, Wilmer Cave (trans.), The Works of the Emperor Julian, Vol. 3. London: Heinemann, New York: Macmillan; 1923. Online at The Internet Archive and The Tertullian Project. Accessed 14 September 2022.
- Libanius
  - Orations
    - Norman, A. F. (ed. & trans.), Libanius: Selected Orations, Vol. 1. Cambridge, MA: Harvard University Press, 1969. Online at Loeb Classics. Accessed 14 September 2022.
  - Letters
    - Foerster, Richard (ed.), Libanii Opera, Vol X: Epistulae 1–839. Hildescheim: Verlangsbuchhandlung, 1963. Online at The Internet Archive. Accessed 18 September 2022.
    - Norman, A. F. (ed. & trans.), Libanius: Autobiography and Selected Letters, 2 Vols.. Cambridge, MA: Harvard University Press, 1992. Online at Loeb Classics (Vol. 1, Vol. 2). Accessed 18 September 2022.
    - Wolf, Johannes Christopher (ed. & trans.), Libanii Sophistae Epistolae. Amsterdam: Jannssonio Waesbergios, 1738. Online at The Internet Archive. Accessed 18 September 2022.
- Philostorgius, Church History [now lost, relevant portions surviving in Artemii Passio]
  - Amidon, Philip R., S.J, Philostorgius: Church History. Society of Biblical Literature; Atlanta, 2007. Online at The Internet Archive. Accessed 15 September 2022.
  - John of Damascus; Kotter, Bonifatius (ed.), "Passio Magni Martyris Artemii" in Dei Schriften des Johannes von Damaskos, Vol. V; in series Patristische Texte un Studien, Band 29. Berlin, New York: Walter De Gruyter. Online at Google Books
  - Lieu, Samuel N. C.; Montserrat, Dominic (eds.), "The Artemii Passio" in From Constantine to Julian: Pagan and Byzantine Views, A source history. London and New York: Routledge, 1996. Online at Google Books. Accessed 15 September 2022.

=== Modern sources ===
- Crawford, Peter (2016). Constantius II: Usurpers, Eunuchs, and the Antichrist. Pen & Sword. ISBN 978-1-78340-055-3.
- Jones, A.H.M.; J.R. Martindale & J. Morris (1971). The Prosopography of the Later Roman Empire Volume 1: A.D. 260–395. Cambridge University Press. ISBN 0-521-07233-6.
- Gibbon, Edward, The History of the Decline and Fall of the Roman Empire. London: Strahan & Cadell, first published 1776–1789.
- Seeck, Otto, Die Briefe des Libanius Zeitlich Geordnet. Leipzig: Hinrichs, 1906. Online at The Internet Archive Accessed 14 September 2022.
- Seeck, Otto, Geschichte des Untergangs der Antiken Welt, Vol. IV. Bernlin: Franz Siemenroth, 1911. Online at The Internet Archive. Accessed 14 September 2022.
- Smith, William, A Dictionary of Greek and Roman Biography and Mythology, Volume III: Oareses-Zygia. London: Murray. 1872. Online at Google Books
- Williams, Sean Robert, Ammianus and Constantius: The Portrayal of a Tyrant in the Res Gestae. University of Tennessee. December 2009.
- Wright, Thomas, The Celt, the Roman, and the Saxon: A History of the Early Inhabitants of Britain, Second Edition. London: Arthur Hall, 1861. Online at Google Books, The Internet Archive, and HathiTrust. Accessed 14 September 2022.
