= Olympias the Deaconess =

Christian saint

Saint Olympias
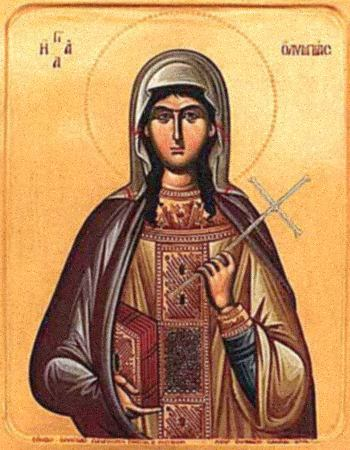

Deaconess
- Born: c. 365; Byzantine Empire
- Died: July 25, 408; Nicomedia
- Venerated in: Catholic Church; Eastern Orthodox Church; Oriental Orthodox Church
- Canonized: Pre-Congregation
- Feast: July 25

Olympias, also known as Saint Olympias and sometimes known as Olympias the Younger to distinguish her from her aunt of the same name (Greek: Ὀλυμπιάς; c. 365 - July 25, 408) was a Christian Roman noblewoman of Greek descent.

Olympias was born sometime between 361 and 368 and raised in either Constantinople or Antioch. She was the daughter born to the Antiochian Greek noblewoman, Alexandra and the wealthy Greek Rhetor, Seleucus. Olympias had a sibling, who was a parent of Olympias and Seleucus. Olympias was named after her late paternal aunt Olympias who was once engaged to the Roman emperor Constans who later married the Roman client king of Arsacid Armenia, Arsaces II (Arshak II). The paternal grandfather of Olympias was Flavius Ablabius who had held consular rank in Constantinople, while her maternal uncle was Calliopius the Rhetor who served as a grammaticus and assistant-teacher under the Rhetor, historian Libanius and later served as a Roman official under the Roman emperors Constantius II and Julian the Apostate.

Olympias is described as the 'beloved daughter' born to Seleucus and Alexandra. At eighteen years of age, Olympias married Nebridius, a nobleman who served as prefect of Constantinople. She was widowed after two years of marriage. Having refusing many offers of marriage, she dedicated her life to the church, serving as a deaconess. She would later become a friend of John Chrysostom.

Her good works included building a hospital and an orphanage and looking after monks who had been led in exile from Nitria. This led John Chrysostom to tell her that she had done almost too much. Her support for Chrysostom led to her exile in 404. Having lost her house, she lived the rest of her life in Nicomedia, dying on July 25, 408, after a long illness.

Olympias is among the one hundred forty saints whose statues adorn the colonnades of Saint Peter's Square.

The nunnery that she founded quickly grew to have 250 nuns, aided by 50 of her servants that she had dedicated for its use. It survived into the 7th century, when its abbess, Sergia, reported that relics relating to Olympias were recovered.

== Sources ==
- Swan, Laura. The Forgotten Desert Mothers: Sayings, Lives, and Stories of Early Christian Women (Paulist Press, 2023)
- Catholic Online - St. Olympias
- New Advent Catholic Encyclopedia - St. Olympias
- Patron Saint Index - Saint Olympias
- De Imperatoribus Romanis - An Online Encyclopedia of Roman Emperors: Constans I (337-350 A.D.)
- Martindale, John R.; Jones, A. H. M.; Morris, John, eds. (1971). The Prosopography of the Later Roman Empire: Volume I, AD 260–395. Cambridge: Cambridge University Press. ISBN 0-521-07233-6.
- P. Moret & B. Cabouret, Sertorius, Libanios, iconographie: a propos de Sertorius, journée d'étude, Toulouse, 7 avril 2000 [suivi de] autour de Libanios, culture et société dans l'antiquité tardive : actes de la table ronde, Avignon, 27 avril 2000, Presses Univ. du Mirail, 2003
- E.A. Wallis Budge, Paradise of the Holy Fathers Part 1, Kessinger Publishing, 2003
- W. Smith & H. Wace, A Dictionary of Christian Biography, Literature, Sects and Doctrines N to S Part Seven, Kessinger Publishing, 2004
- Selected Letters of Libanius: From the Age of Constantius and Julian, Liverpool University Press, 2004
- New Rome: The Roman Empire in the East, AD 395–700, Paul Stephenson, Profile, 2022
