= Church of the Holy Apostles =

Church and imperial mausoleum in Constantinople

Coordinates: 41°1′11″N 28°56′59″E

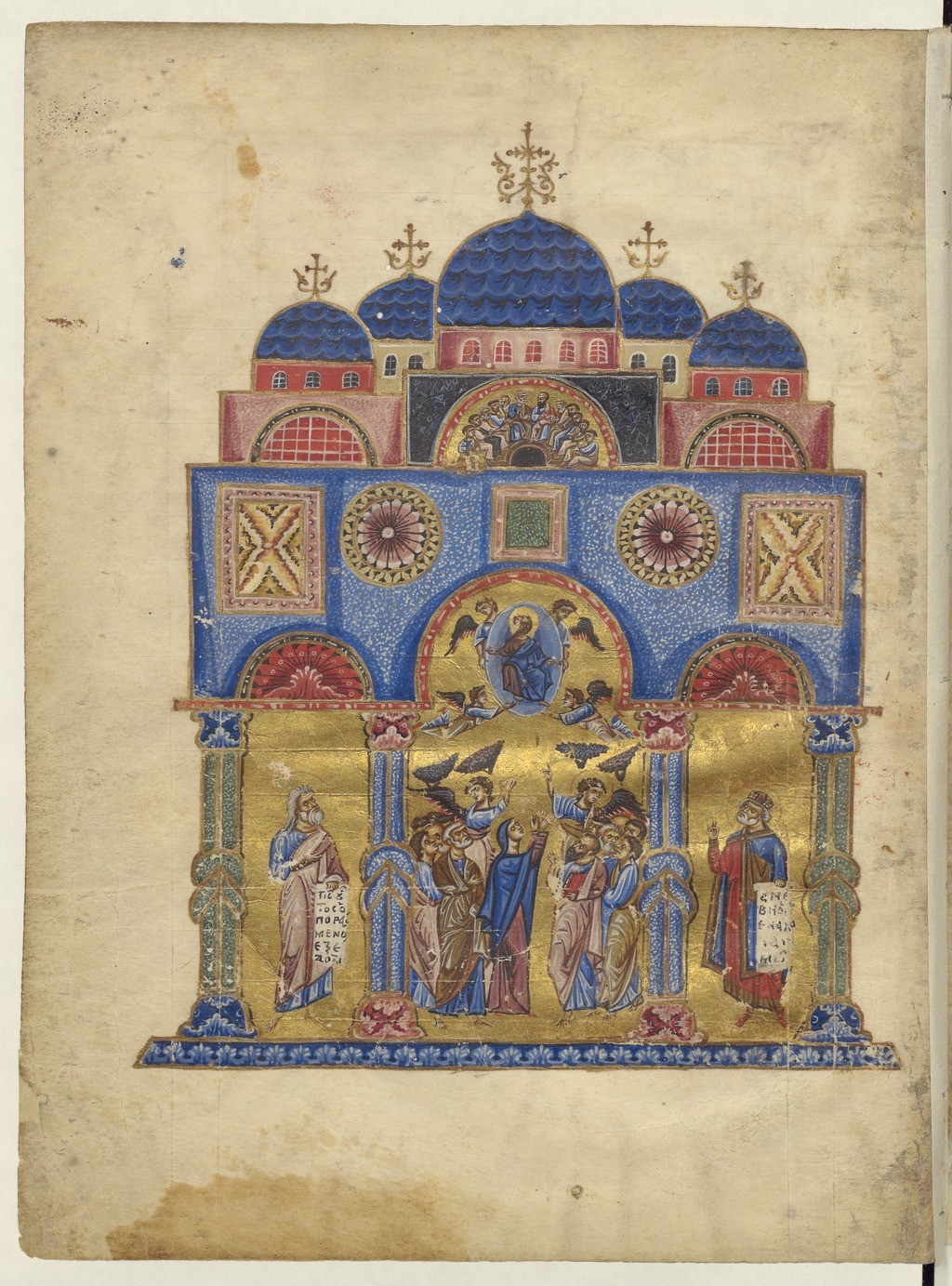
- An image from a National Library of France codex (12th century), believed to be a representation of the Church of the Holy Apostles

Religion
- Affiliation: Eastern Orthodox (originally); Sunni Islam (later)
- Ecclesiastical or organisational status: Destroyed, replaced with the Fatih Mosque

Location
- Location: Istanbul, Turkey
- Interactive map of Church of the Holy Apostles

Architecture
- Type: Church (originally), later the Fatih mosque
- Style: Byzantine
- Materials: Brick, stone

The Church of the Holy Apostles (Greek: Ἅγιοι Ἀπόστολοι, Agioi Apostoloi; Turkish: Havariyyun Kilisesi), also known as the Imperial Polyandrion (imperial cemetery), was a Byzantine Eastern Orthodox church in Constantinople, capital of the Eastern Roman Empire. The first structure dated to the 4th century, though future emperors would add to and improve upon it. It was second in size and importance only to the Hagia Sophia among the great churches of the capital.

When Constantinople fell to the Ottomans in 1453, the Holy Apostles briefly became the seat of the Ecumenical Patriarch of the Eastern Orthodox Church. Thre Patriarch was not allowed to make repairs to the church and three years later the patriarchate was moved to the Theotokos Pammakaristos Church. In 1461, the remains of the Church of the Holy Apostles were demolished by the Ottomans to make way for the Fatih Mosque.

== History ==
The original Church of the Holy Apostles was dedicated in about 330 by Constantine the Great, the founder of Constantinople, the new capital of the Roman Empire. The church was unfinished when Constantine died in 337, and it was completed by his son and successor Constantius II, who buried his father's remains there. The church was dedicated to the Twelve Apostles of Jesus, and it was the emperor's intention to gather relics of all the Apostles in the church. However, only relics of Saint Andrew, Saint Luke and Saint Timothy (the latter two not members of the formal group known as the Twelve Apostles) were acquired, and in later centuries it came to be assumed that the church was dedicated to these three only.

By the reign of the Emperor Justinian I, the church was no longer considered grand enough, and a new Church of the Holy Apostles was built on the same site. The historian Procopius attributes the rebuilding to Justinian, while the writer known as Pseudo-Codinus attributes it to the Empress Theodora. The new church was designed and built by the architects Anthemius of Tralles and Isidorus of Miletus, the same architects behind the rebuild of Hagia Sophia, and was consecrated on 28 June 550. The relics of Constantine and the three saints were re-installed in the new church, and a mausoleum for Justinian and his family was built at the end of its northern arm.

Depictions from the 10th cent. Menologion of Basil II

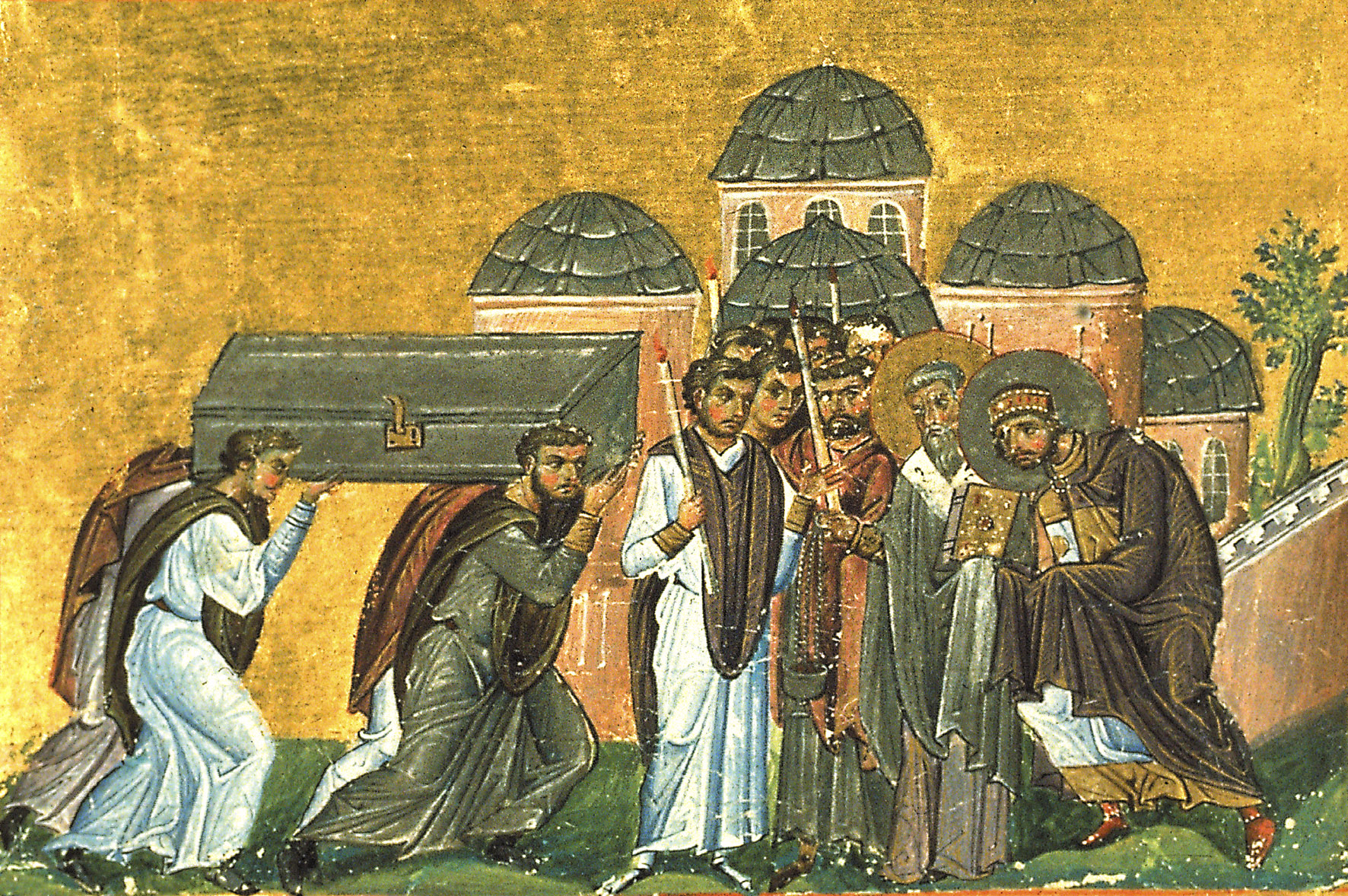
The relics of St. John Chrysostom

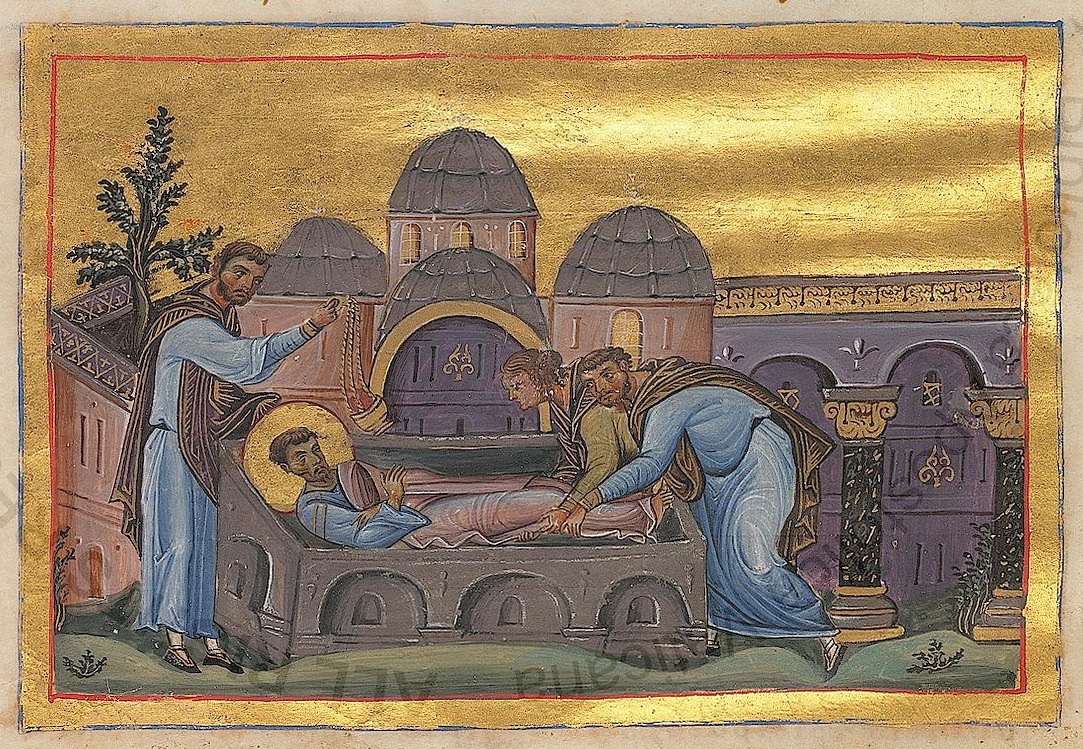
The relics of St. Luke

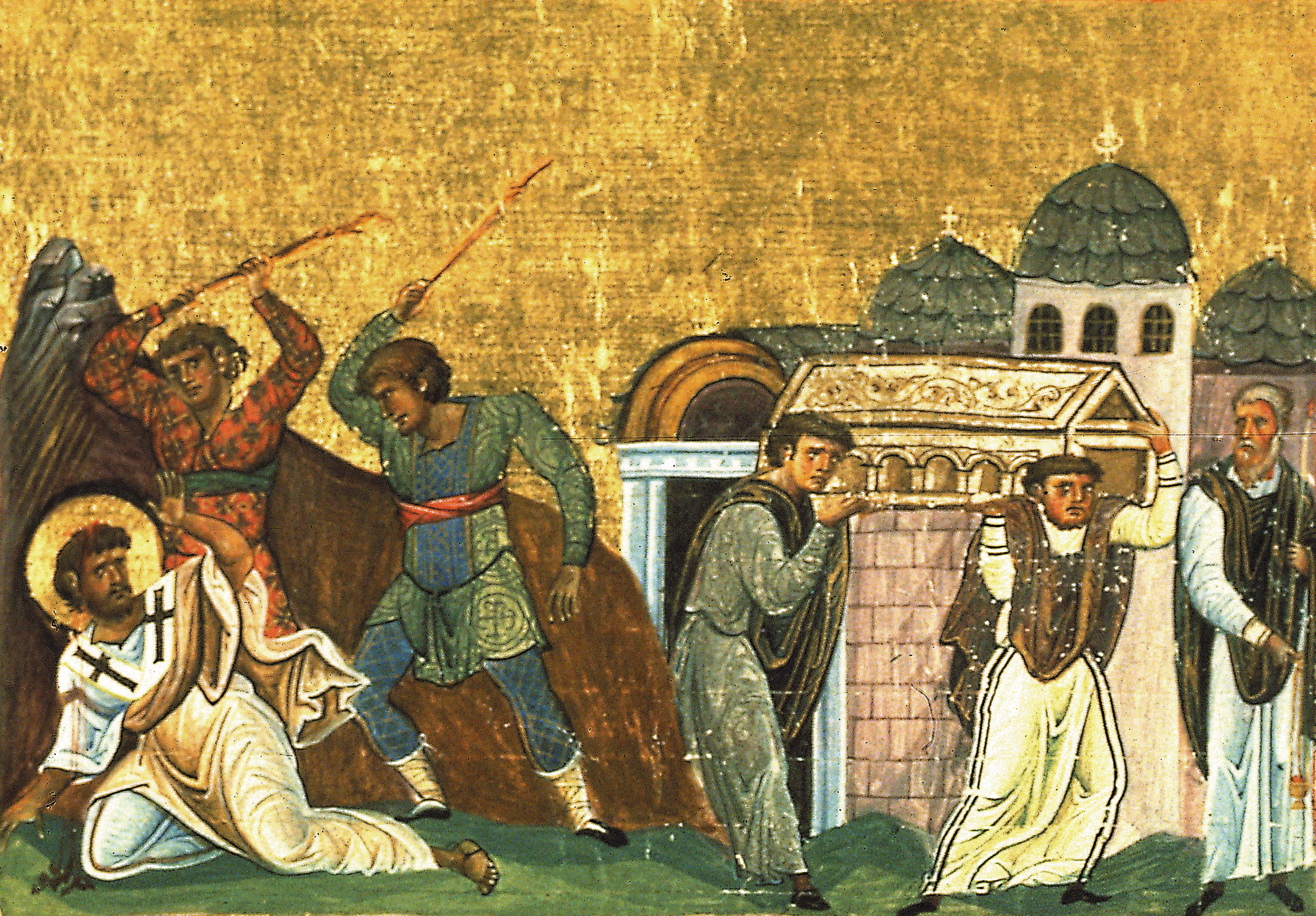
The relics of St. Timothy

For more than 700 years, the Church of the Holy Apostles was the second most important church in Constantinople, after that of the Holy Wisdom (Hagia Sophia). But whereas the church of the Holy Wisdom was in the city's oldest part, that of the Holy Apostles stood in the newer part of the expanded imperial capital, on the great thoroughfare called Mese Odós (English: Central Street), and became the city's busiest church. Most emperors and many patriarchs and bishops were buried here, and their relics were venerated by the faithful for centuries.

The church's most treasured possessions were the skulls of Saints Andrew, Luke and Timothy, but the church also held what was believed to be part of the "Column of Flagellation", to which Jesus had been bound and flogged. Its treasury also held relics of Saint John Chrysostom and other Church Fathers, saints and martyrs. Over the years the church acquired huge amounts of gold, silver and gems donated by the faithful.

Emperor Basil I renovated and probably enlarged the church, and in 874 the remains of the historian and patriarch Nikephoros I of Constantinople, who had died earlier in the century, were reinterred in the rebuilt church, where they became the site of annual imperial devotion. In the 10th century Constantine of Rhodes composed a Description of the Building of the Apostles in verse, which he dedicated to Constantine VII.

The basilica was looted during the Fourth Crusade in 1204. The historian Nicetas Choniates records that the Crusaders plundered the imperial tombs for their gold and gems. Not even Justinian's tomb was spared. The tomb of Emperor Heraclius was opened and his golden crown was stolen with the late emperor's hair still attached to it. Some of these treasures were taken to Venice, where they can be seen in St Mark's Basilica, while the body of St. Gregory was brought to Rome.

When Michael VIII Palaeologus recaptured the city from the Crusaders, he erected a statue of the Archangel Michael at the church to commemorate the event and his part in it. The church was partially restored again by Andronicus II Palaeologus in the early 14th century, but thereafter fell into disrepair as the empire declined and Constantinople's population fell. The Florentine Cristoforo Buondelmonti saw the decaying church in 1420.

In 1453 Constantinople fell to the Ottomans. The cathedral church of Hagia Sophia was seized and turned into a mosque, and Sultan Mehmed II reassigned to the Orthodox Patriarch Gennadius Scholarius the Church of the Holy Apostles, which temporarily became the new administrative centre of the Ecumenical Orthodox Church. But the church was in a dilapidated state, and the area around it was soon settled by Muslims. After the killing of a Muslim by an Orthodox citizen, the Muslim dwellers became hostile to the Christians, so in 1456 Gennadius decided to move the Patriarchate to the Church of Theotokos Pammakaristos in the Çarşamba neighbourhood.

After the demolition of the old church in 1462, the sultan built the Fatih Mosque (English: Mosque of the Conqueror) on the site.

== Description and influence ==
=== Constantine's building ===
The grounds of the first church of the Holy Apostles contained both a rotunda mausoleum built by Constantine and a church built soon afterward by his successor Constantius. Little is known about the appearance of the original church except that it was shaped as a cross, but the historian Eusebius (c. 263–339) glowing description of Constantine's mausoleum and the surrounding grounds before Constantius's church was built:

This building he carried to a vast height, and brilliantly decorated by encasing it from the foundation to the roof with marble slabs of various colors. He also formed the inner roof of finely fretted work, and overlaid it throughout with gold. The external covering, which protected the building from the rain, was of brass instead of tiles; and this too was splendidly and profusely adorned with gold, and reflected the sun’s rays with a brilliancy which dazzled the distant beholder. The dome was entirely encompassed by a finely carved tracery, wrought in brass and gold.

Such was the magnificence with which the emperor was pleased to beautify this church. The building was surrounded by an open area of great extent, the four sides of which were terminated by porticos which enclosed the area and the church itself. Adjoining these porticos were ranges of stately chambers, with baths and promenades, and besides many apartments adapted to the use of those who had charge of the place.

The cruciform plan was a landmark development in Christian architecture, because it replaced a basilica plan with a centralized shrine plan. Dozens of cruciform church buildings of the late fourth and early fifth centuries were rough imitations of the Constantine-era Church of the Holy Apostles, such as St. Ambrose's Church of the Apostles in Milan, the martyrium of St. Babylas in Antioch, and the Church of Saint Simeon Stylites in Aleppo, Syria.

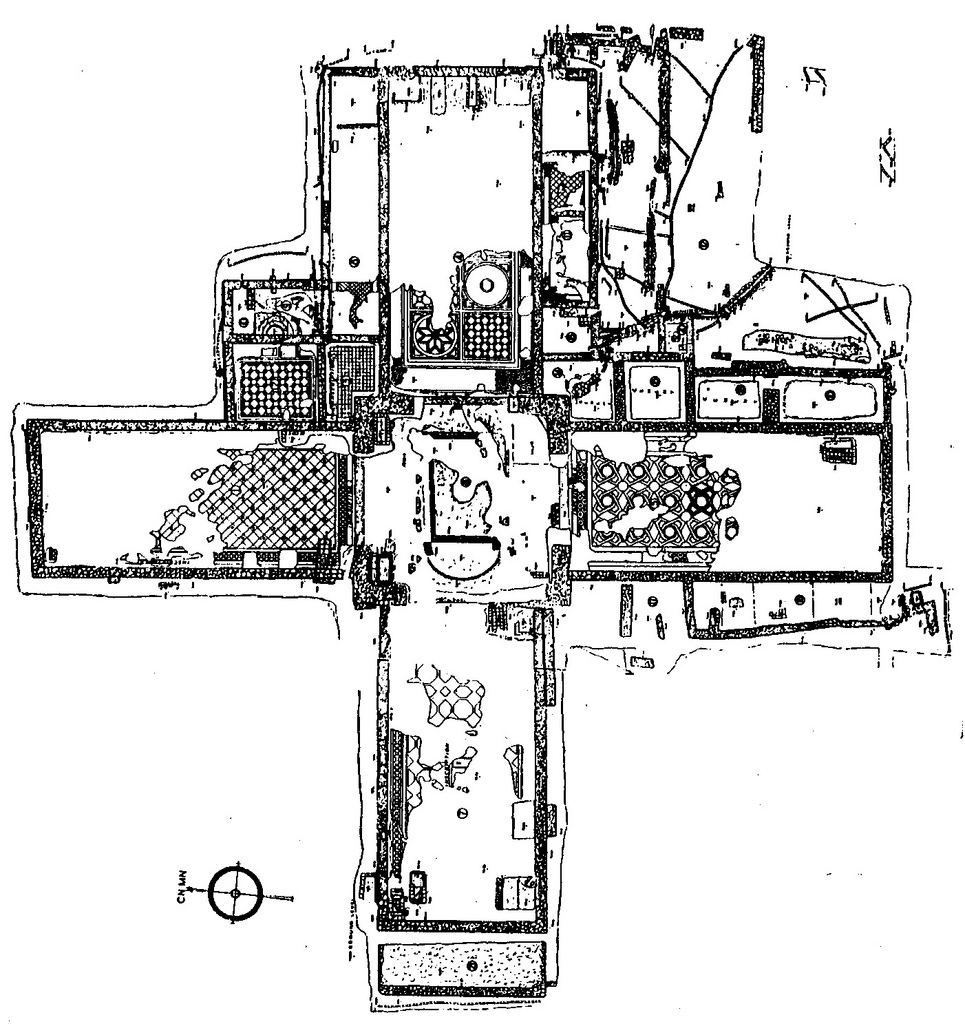
Martyrium of Saint Babylas
Antioch, Syria

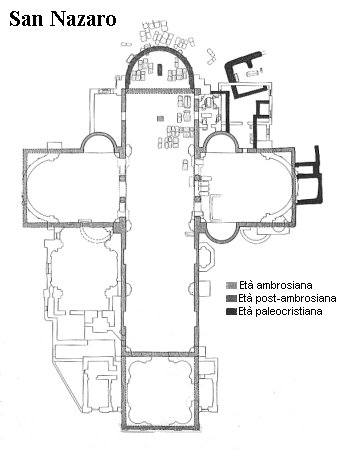
Church of the Holy Apostles
Milan, Italy

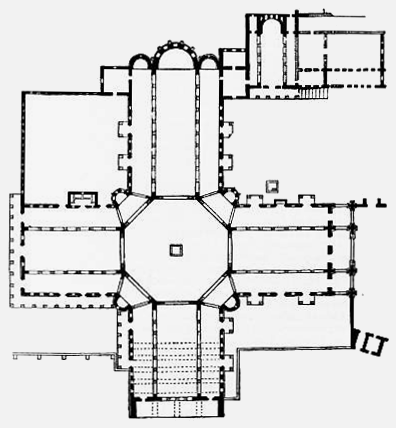
Church of Saint Simeon Stylites
Aleppo, Syria

Floor plans of churches believed to have been inspired by the first Church of the Holy Apostles while it existed.

=== Justinian's building ===
The second church, built under Justinian I, was also cruciform but was surmounted by five domes: one above each arm of the cross and one above the central bay where the arms intersected. The western arm of the cross extended farther than the others, forming an atrium. The design details are a matter of some dispute. The contemporary historian Procopius (c. 500–565) gives the following description:

Two straight lines were drawn, intersecting each other in the middle of the form of a cross, one extending east and west, and the other which crossed this running north and south. On the outside these lines were defined by walls on all of the sides, while on the inside they were traced by rows of columns standing above one another. At the crossing of the two straight lines, that is to say at about the middle, there was set aside a place which may not be entered by those who may not celebrate the mysteries; this with good reason they call the "sanctuary." The two arms of this enclosure which lie along the transverse line are equal to each other, but the arm which extends toward the west, along the upright line, is enough longer than the other to make the form of the cross. That portion of the roof which is above the sanctuary, as it is called, is built, in the center at least, on a plan resembling the Church of Sophia, except that it is inferior to it in size. The arches, four in number, rise aloft and are bound together in the same manner and the circular drum which stands upon them is pierced by windows, and the dome which arches above this seems to float in the air and not to rest upon solid masonry, though actually it is well supported. Thus, then, was the central part of the roof constructed. And the arms of the building, which are four, ... were roofed on the same plan as the central portion, but this one feature is lacking: underneath the domes the masonry is not pierced by windows.

A tenth-century poem by Constantine the Rhodian, or Constantine of Rhodes, preserved in a fifteenth-century manuscript, contains an ekphrasis and description of the church. The domes appear to have been drastically altered between 944 and 985 by the addition of windowed drums beneath all five domes and by raising the central dome higher than the others. The 12th-century writer Nicholas Mesarites also recorded a description of the church, of which only fragments survive. Although there are brief mentions of the building in a variety of sources, the accounts of Procopius, Constantine of Rhodes, and Nicholas Mesarites are the only substantial textual descriptions of the building's appearance to have survived.

Churches such as the Basilica of St. John, St Mark's Basilica, the Cathédrale Saint-Front, and the Basilica of Saint Anthony of Padua are believed to have been modelled on Justinian's Holy Apostles but differ from each other significantly.

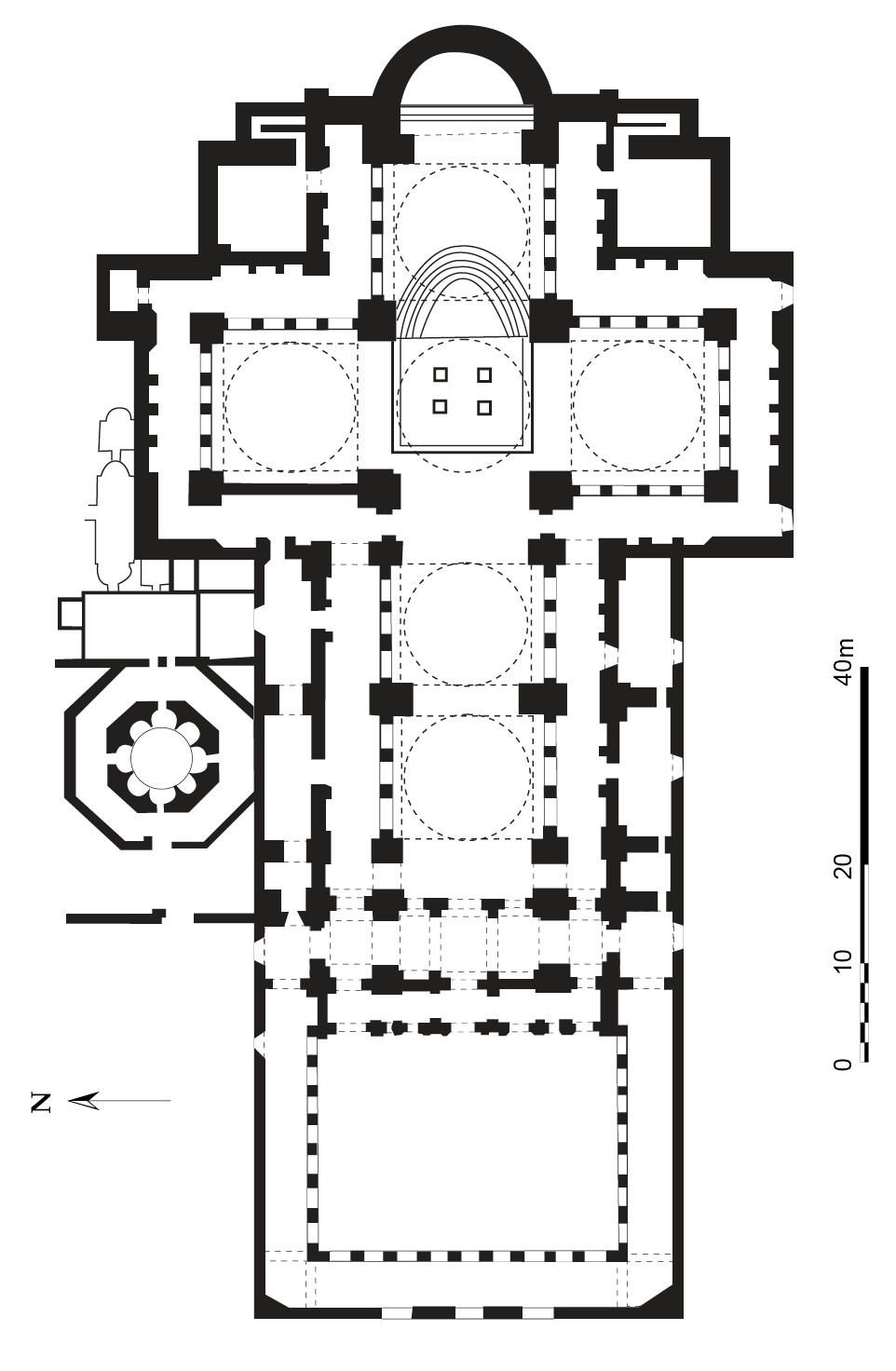
Basilica of St. John
Selçuk, Turkey

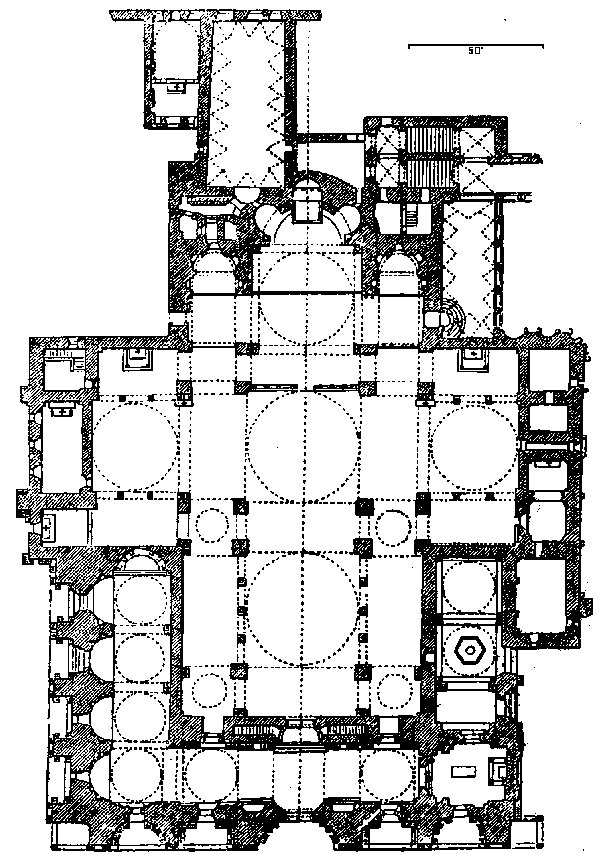
St. Mark's Basilica
Venice, Italy

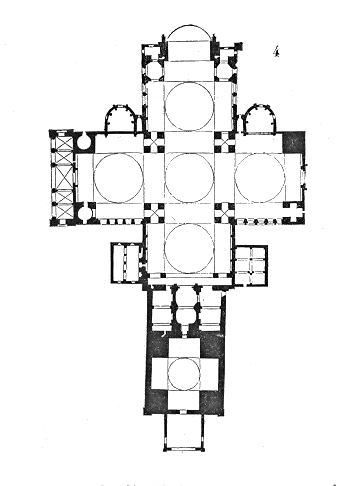
Cathédrale Saint-Front
Périgueux, France

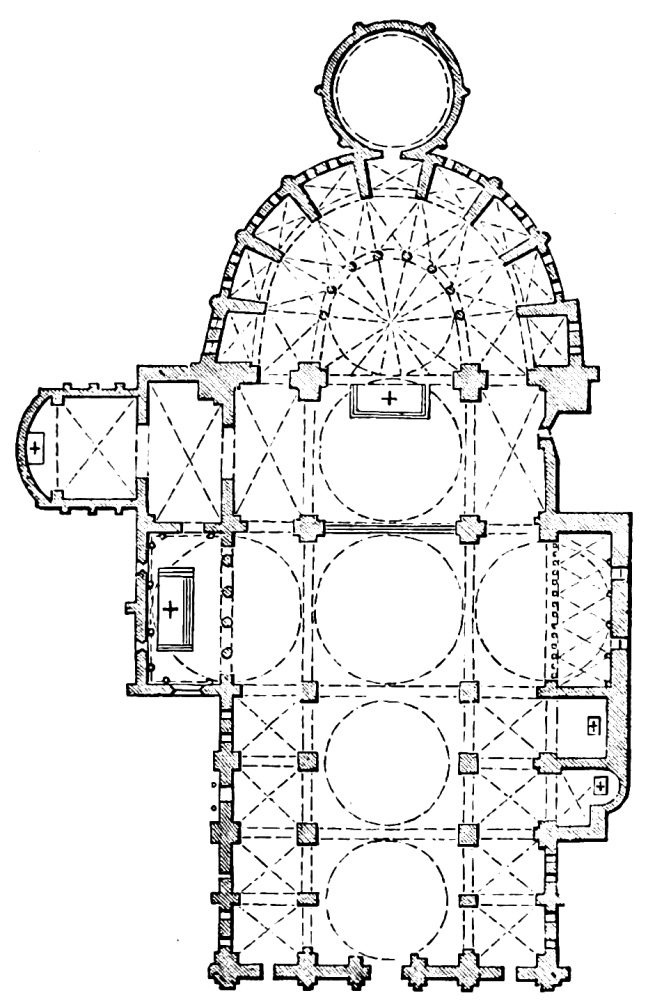
Basilica of Saint Anthony of Padua
Padua, Italy

Floor plans of churches believed to have been inspired by the second Church of the Holy Apostles while it existed.

== Burials ==
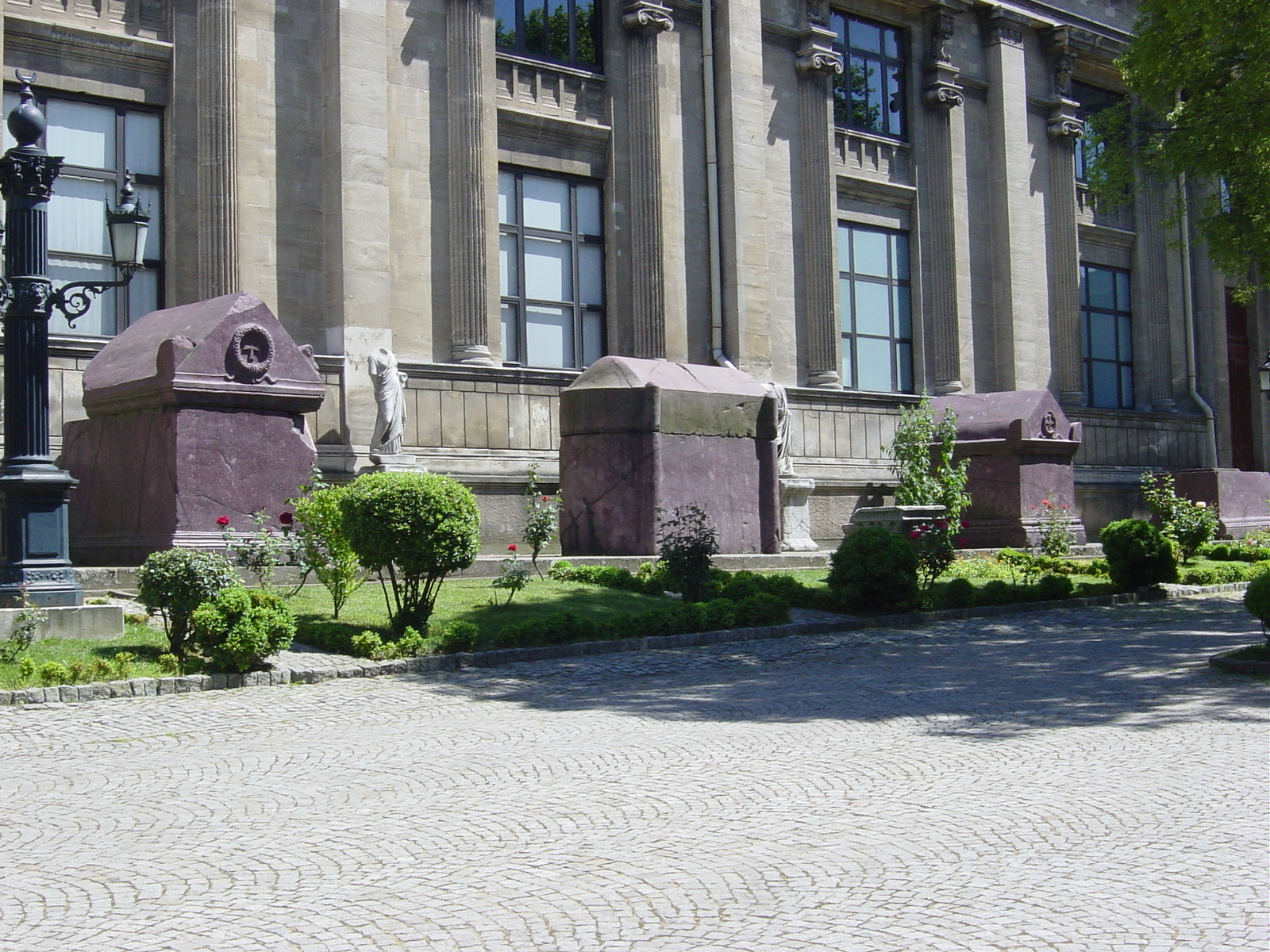
Porphyry sarcophagi of Byzantine emperors on display outside the Istanbul Archaeology Museums

The church's mausoleums were the resting place for most Eastern Roman emperors and members of their families for seven centuries, beginning with Constantine I (d. 337) and ending with Constantine VIII (d. 1028). With no more space available, emperors began to be buried in other churches and monasteries around the city. The tombs in the church of Holy Apostles are known only from lists in literary sources, one of which is contained in De Ceremoniis.

Although the sarcophagi of the emperors were raided by Crusaders during the Fourth Crusade in 1204, some of the oldest porphyry sarcophagi have survived: two in the atrium of the Hagia Eirene, four outside the Archaeological Museum, and a fragment of a seventh in the museum's "Istanbul through the Ages" pavilion; this fragment is believed to be from the sarcophagus of Constantine I.

Among those buried in the church were:

- Constantine I (337)
- Constantius II (361)
- Julian (363)
- Jovian (364) and his wife Charito
- Valentinian I (375) and his wife Marina Severa
- Theodosius I (395)
- Arcadius (408) and Aelia Eudoxia (404)
- Theodosius II (450)
- Marcian (457) and Pulcheria (453)
- Leo I (474)
- Leo II (474)
- Zeno (491)
- Anastasius I (518) and Ariadne (515)
- Justinian I (565) and Theodora (548)
- Justin II (578) and Sophia (601)
- Tiberius II Constantine (582)
- Ino Anastasia (593)
- Paul, father of Maurice (593)
- Heraclius (641) and Eudokia (612)
- Heraclius Constantine (641)
- Fausta (668)
- Constantine IV (685) and Anastasia (711)
- Anastasios II (719)
- Eudokia
- Leo III the Isaurian (741)
- Constantine V (775) (Note: Removed, thrown in the sea and replaced by Irene during Michael III’s reign)
- Leo IV the Khazar (780)
- Irene of Athens (803)
- Michael II (829)
- Constantine (836)
- Theophilos (842)
- Michael III (886)
- Basil I (886) and Eudokia Ingerina (882)
- Leo VI the Wise (912) and his three wives (Theophano Martiniake (893), Zoe Zaoutzaina (899), Eudokia Baïana (901))
- Alexander (913)
- Constantine VII (959)
- Romanos II (963)
- Nikephoros II (969)
- Constantine VIII (1028)
- Zoe Porphyrogenita (1050)
- Theodora Porphyrogenita (1056)

The bodies of Patriarch Nikephoros I of Constantinople and Patriarch Cyriacus II of Constantinople were also buried there.

== See also ==
- Ancient Roman and Byzantine domes
- List of Roman domes
- Roman architecture
- Byzantine architecture
- Byzantine Empire
- Constantinople
- Eulalios
- Hagia Sophia
- Church (building)
- Church architecture
- Basilica
