= Colchian Academy =

3rd-century school in Colchis, Georgia

Higher School of Rhetoric of Colchis (Georgian: კოლხეთის უმაღლესი რიტორიკული სკოლა), also known as Colchis Academy (Georgian: კოლხეთის აკადემია) or Phasis Academy (Georgian: ფაზისის აკადემია) was a higher educational institution of philosophy and rhetoric that existed in the III-IV centuries AD in the vicinity of the city of Phasis (modern-day city of Poti) in Western Georgia.

The only direct reference to the existence of the school is found in one of the letters of the Greek philosopher Themistius (lived and worked around 317–388).

There is no information about what programs and in what language the teaching took place or who taught it. Themistius does not name the founder of the higher rhetorical school of Colchis, however he calls him "wise" and "virtuous".

Themistius says that the students of this school excelled in the art of rhetoric, and shone at the Greek festivals. This reference is very important as it tells us that the graduates of the academy were educated in the Greek language and classical Greek literature.

The fact that the school accepted young people who knew Greek language makes Georgian scientists think that there should also be a preparatory school in Colchis.

It can also be seen from Themistius' report that the higher rhetorical school of Colchis should not differ much in its content and purpose from the ancient Greek and Roman rhetorical schools. Presumably, the school provided students with the level of education that Cicero and Quintilian envisioned for an orator. It is probable that, as in the Roman school of rhetoric, in the Colchian academy, along with the basics of philosophy and law, they taught literature, astronomy, music, and elements of mathematics.

Rhetorical art had a great practical invention in Georgia at that time. In the historical writings of Agathia Scholaktikos (536-582), there is a record of brilliant oratorical speeches of Georgian political figures (Aeëtes, Fartazes and others). Obviously, they had to acquire this knowledge consistently and thoroughly.

== Date of Establishment ==
Colchis Academy is mentioned in the sources of the 4th century. However, Georgian scholars assume that the academy must have existed at least since the end of the third century. In the already mentioned letter, Themistius says that he and his father, the famous teacher of philosophy Eugenius, were educated in the extreme region of the Pontus, near Phasis, “in a place which was the temple of the Muses. "

Themistius was born in 317, and in 345 he was already a teacher in Constantinople. Taking this into account, he should have studied at the Kolkheti Academy in the 30s-40s of the 4th century. If we take into account that his father also studied at the academy, we can assume that the academy already existed at the end of the 3rd century or the beginning of the 4th century.

== Notable alumni ==
According to the famous Georgian scientist, Simon Kaukhchishvili, John the Laz, teacher of Peter the Iberian, was a graduate of Colchis Academy.
