= Friedrich Sylburg =

German classical scholar

Friedrich Sylburg (1536 – 17 February 1596) was a German classical scholar.

The son of a farmer, he was born at Wetter near Marburg. He studied at Marburg, Jena, Geneva, and, lastly, Paris, where his teacher was Henry Estienne (Stephanus), to whose great Greek Thesaurus Sylburg afterwards made important contributions.

Returning to Germany, he held educational posts at Neuhausen near Worms and at Lich near Gießen, where he edited a useful edition of the Institutiones in graecam linguam (1580) of Nicolaus Clenardus (Cleynaerts). In 1583 he resigned his post at Lich and moved to Frankfurt to act as corrector and editor of Greek texts for the enterprising publisher Johann Wechel. To his Frankfurt period belong the editions of Pausanias, Herodotus, Dionysius Halicarnassensis (one of his best pieces of work, highly praised by Carsten Niebuhr), Paeanius, Aristotle, the Greek and Latin sources for the history of the Roman emperors and the Peri syntaxeos of Apollonius Dyscolus.

In 1591 he moved to Heidelberg, where he became librarian to the elector palatine. The Wechel series was continued by Hieronymus Commelinus (Jerome Commelin) of Heidelberg, for whom Sylburg edited Clement of Alexandria, Justin Martyr, the Etymologicum magnum, the Scriptores de re rustica, the Greek gnomic poets, Xenophon, Nonnus and other works. All Sylburg's editions show great critical power and indefatigable industry; the latter may well have caused his death.

== Works ==
- F. Sylburg (Ed.), Dionisii Halicarnassei scripta quae exstant, omnia, et historica, et rhetorica (Frankfurt: heirs of Andreas Wechel 1586) (parallel Greek and Latin), available at Google Books
- Notes of Sylburg in a critical edition of Aristotle, De Poetica Liber (parallel Greek and Latin), available at Google Books
- Ἐτυμολογικὸν τὸ Μέγα or Etymologicon Magnum (Leipzig, 1816) (in Greek), available at Google Books
- Various Works of Sylburg held and digitized in original editions, freely available at Münchener DigitalisierungsZentrum Digitale Bibliothek
- List of Works in WorldCat

== Literature and additional sources ==
- J. G. Jungius, Vita Frid. Sylburgii (Berleburgi & Frankfurt, 1745).
- Fr. Creuzer, 'De Frid. Sylburgii vita et scriptis oratio', in Nova Acta soc. Lat. Jenensis (ed. Eichstädt), vol. I (Lips. 1806), p. 79–102.
- Fr. Creuzer, Frid. Sylburgi epistolae quinque ad Paulum Melissum (Five letters of Friedrich Sylburg to Paul Melissum) (Frankfurt 1827). Also in Creuzer's Selected Works (Lips. 1854), p. 195–213.
- K. W. Justi, 'Friedrich Sylburg', in Strieder's Hessischer Gelehrten-Geschichte, Vol. 18 (Marburg 1819), p. 481–494. Also as a separate printing, Marburg 1818. This work cites references to earlier writing about Sylburg.
- Schoell, Biographie universelle ancienne et moderne, vol. 18 (Paris 1826), p. 301 ff.
- L. Kayser, 'Heidelberger Philologen im 16. Jahrhundert,' printed in the Festschrift zur Begrüßung der 24. Philologenversammlung (Leipzig 1865), p. 142–147.
- Sylburg's writings are listed by Joachim Jungius cited above, p. 35–38; in Christian Gottlieb Jöcher’s Allgemeines Gelehrten-Lexikon (1750–51), Vol. IV, Sp. 956 f.; in Johann Heinrich Zedler’s Universal-Lexikon, Vol. 41, Sp. 555–57; and most fully by Karl Wilhelm Justi cited above, p. 490–92.
