= Lucillianus (magister equitum) =

Roman army officer

Personal details
- Born: Likely Pannonia, Roman Empire
- Died: 363 Remi (Reims), Roman Gaul
- Children: Charito, wife of Jovian

Military service
- Years of service: 350–363
- Rank: Magister equitum Magister peditum
- Battles/wars: Persian wars of Constantius II

Lucillianus (fl. 350–363 AD) was a high-ranking Roman army officer and father-in-law of the emperor Jovian. He fought with success in the war against Persia, and played a part in the execution of the emperor Constantius II's cousin, Gallus. In 361, Lucillianus was kidnapped by the emperor Julian and forced into retirement. He was recalled to service after the accession of his son-in-law Jovian in 363, and given a senior military command, only to be murdered that same year by mutinous troops in Gaul.

== Biography ==
=== Career under Constantius II ===
Lucillianus was the father of Charito, wife of the Roman emperor Jovian (r. 363–364). He probably, like Jovian, came from the province of Pannonia. His hometown may have been Sirmium, Moesia Superior, where he was once stationed and later resided during his retirement. In 350, the emperor Constantius II (r. 337–361) gave Lucillianus command of the war against the Sasanian Empire, and, in this capacity, he successfully defended the fortress of Nisibis against Persian attacks. (Note: Seeck suggested he held the rank of dux Mesopotamiae, but the authors of the PLRE found comes rei militaris more likely. Lucillianus's superior in rank was the magister equitum, Ursicinus.) In 354, Lucillianus was appointed comes domesticorum (commander of the household troops) of Constantius' cousin, Gallus Caesar, with the secret purpose of keeping watch over Gallus as he was unknowingly escorted to his execution. In 358–359 he went alongside Procopius (the future imperial pretender) as an envoy to the Sasanian king Shapur II.

Lucillianus stood loyal to Constantius when the emperor's other cousin, Julian, rebelled and proclaimed himself emperor in Gaul, 360. By 361 he had been appointed commander of Constantius's armies in Illyricum, (Note: He had the military ranks of comes and magister equitum (master of cavalry), but in reality he probably commanded both the infantry and cavalry, there being "no strict separation between the two branches of the army".) with his headquarters at Sirmium, and intended to oppose Julian as he marched east. However, while lodged at the town of Bononia (Banoštor, Serbia) north of Sirmium, Lucillianus was surprised and captured in a night-time raid by Julian's troops; he was seized apparently while still asleep, and brought in a state of shock before the pretender. It was said Julian offered Lucillianus the opportunity to perform an act of submission and "adoration" (adoratio), to which the latter boldly responded by instead questioning the wisdom of the rebellion. When Constantius died that same year and Julian became undisputed Roman emperor, Lucillianus was stripped of his command and went into retirement at Sirmium.

=== Recall by Jovian and assassination ===
After the death of Julian during his expedition against Persia in 363, Lucillianus's son-in-law, Jovian, a member of Julian's household guard, was acclaimed emperor by the army. Jovian recalled his father-in-law to service and appointed him commander of the Roman armies in the praetorian prefecture of Italy, with the rank of magister equitum et peditum (master of cavalry and infantry), instructing him also to proceed towards the imperial seat at Mediolanum (Milan) and secure the new emperor's authority in the western provinces. Jovian also took care to relieve the incumbent commander of the armies in Gaul, Jovinus, because, as a close supporter the emperor Julian, his loyalty to the new regime was apparently viewed as suspect. (Note: When Lucillianus was discharged in 361, it had been Jovinus whom the emperor Julian appointed in his place, and Lucillianus now "may have felt sweet revenge" upon seeing Jovinus in turn dismissed.) His new nominee, Malarichus, refused the position however, and, upon hearing of it, Lucillianus (having by then arrived at Mediolanum) promptly hurried to Remi (modern Reims), capital of Gallia Belgica, to claim the military command for himself.

Following his arrival, Lucillianus began an audit of the local administration because he suspected some officials of corruption and embezzlement. It was said he conducted his investigation with great vigor but little tact, because the corrupt staffers had taken care to gain the favor and protection of the soldiers. One uncovered culprit fled to the barracks, where his popularity with the troops guaranteed his safety. This official then stirred up the soldiers (probably the Batavi) by falsely claiming that the emperor Julian was still alive and Jovian was just a rebel. A mutiny ensued, at which Lucillianus was killed; one of his retainers, Seniauchus, shared his fate, while the other, Valentinian (soon-to-be emperor), escaped with his life. The emperor did not long outlive his father-in-law, dying in February of the following year.
