= Calliopius of Antioch =

Greek rhetor and official of the Roman Empire

Calliopius (Greek: Καλλιόπιος, fl. 350s–360s AD) was a Greek rhetor and official of the Roman Empire.

== Family and early life ==
Calliopius was a Greek nobleman from Antioch. The parents of Calliopius are unknown, but he had some relationship to the sometime quaestor sacri palatii Montius Magnus, and was perhaps his son.

In his youth, he studied with Zenobius and although at birth he was a Christian, Calliopius became a pagan of the Ancient Greek religion. His date of birth is unknown and little is known on his early life.

== Libanius and his political career ==
Calliopius became skilled in Rhetoric. Calliopius was friends with Seleucus, Libanius and was a contemporary to the Roman emperor Julian the Apostate who ruled from November 361 until June 26, 363. He friendship with these three men went back to the early 350s. Calliopius had taught with Libanius as an assistant-teacher in Antioch and Constantinople. Calliopius was one of the correspondents to Libanius in which various letters between the both of them have survived.

During his time as an assistant teacher with Libanius, he may have served in an unknown advocate role. After, Calliopius held a minor post in the imperial chancellery. Either in 359 or in 360 he served as an assessor perhaps in Euphratensis, as in 360 he was being prosecuted for his conduct as an assessor. In 360 he was made a senator, und in 362 Julian promoted him to governor (consularis) of Macedonia in 362.

Calliopius’ son was the advocate and translator Paeanius.

== Sources ==
- A.H.M. Jones, J.R. Martindale & J. Morris, The Prosopography of the Later Roman Empire: Volume 1, AD 260–395, Cambridge University Press, 1971
- Antioch as a Centre of Hellenic Culture, as Observed by Libanius, Liverpool University Press, 2001
- P. Moret & B. Cabouret, Sertorius, Libanios, iconographie: a propos de Sertorius, journée d'étude, Toulouse, 7 avril 2000 [suivi de] autour de Libanios, culture et société dans l'antiquité tardive : actes de la table ronde, Avignon, 27 avril 2000, Presses Univ. du Mirail, 2003
- Selected Letters of Libanius: From the Age of Constantius and Julian, Liverpool University Press, 2004
