= Seleucus (praetorian prefect) =

Seleucus (Greek: Σέλευκος) was a wealthy Christian Roman Senator of Greek descent who lived in the second half of the 4th century and first half of the 5th century.

One of the parents of Seleucus, was the sibling to the great Christian Saint Olympias. Seleucus had one sibling, a sister called Olympias.

He was the second man named Seleucus in the family of Flavius Ablabius who had held consular rank in Constantinople. Seleucus is the known grandson of the Antiochian noblewoman Alexandra and her husband, the wealthy Rhetor Seleucus.

In his political career, Seleucus appeared to have been a Roman politician of some authority and prestige. In the year 412 and 414 until 415, Seleucus served as a praetorian prefect for Italy in the Diocese of Africa, as his position was based in Carthage. His prefecture of Africa was served during the reign of the Western Roman Emperor Honorius who ruled 392 until 423 and his nephew Theodosius II, who ruled as Byzantine Emperor from 408 until 450 of the Theodosian dynasty.

During Seleucus’ time as prefect, various correspondences between him, Honorius and Theodosius II have survived. The letters reveal that Seleucus was a capable Roman official. After this moment, no more is known of Seleucus.

== Sources ==
- J. Story, Commentaries on the Conflict of Laws, Foreign and Domestic, in Regard to Contracts, Rights, and Remedies, and Especially in Regard to Marriages, Divorces, Wills, Successions, and Judgements, The Lawbook Exchange, Ltd., 1841
- E.A. Wallis Budge, Paradise of the Holy Fathers Part 1, Kessinger Publishing, 2003
- P. Moret & B. Cabouret, Sertorius, Libanios, iconographie: a propos de Sertorius, journée d'étude, Toulouse, 7 avril 2000 [suivi de] autour de Libanios, culture et société dans l'antiquité tardive : actes de la table ronde, Avignon, 27 avril 2000, Presses Univ. du Mirail, 2003
