= Montius Magnus =

Montius Magnus (flourished 4th century AD, died 354) was a Roman politician.

Little is known of his origins, although he may have originated in Africa. At some point before 351 he served as a proconsul, possibly of Constantinople.

When Constantius Gallus was made Caesar in 351, Magnus was appointed as his quaestor sacri palatii, and raised the rank of patricius. Magnus was lynched by the troops at the instigation of Gallus in 354, but the reason is unclear: some sources report that he tried to defend the praetorian prefect of the East Domitian, who had insulted Gallus, others that Magnus insulted Gallus as well, while others claim that he informed the Augustus Constantius II of Gallus' plots against him. At any rate, Magnus and Domitian were lynched side by side.

Magnus' offspring is unknown. He may have had a son called Calliopius, who was governor of Macedonia in 362.

== Sources ==
- Martindale, John R.; Jones, A. H. M.; Morris, John, eds. (1971). The Prosopography of the Later Roman Empire: Volume I, AD 260–395. Cambridge: Cambridge University Press. ISBN 0-521-07233-6.
- Bradbury, Scott (2004), Selected Letters of Libanius: From the Age of Constantius and Julian, Liverpool University Press

== See also ==
- Constantius Gallus
