= Eulalios =

12th-century Byzantine artist

Eulalios (Greek: Ευλάλιος) was a famous Byzantine painter and mosaicist who worked during the 12th century under Manuel I.

His name was noted by several writers of 12-14th centuries who also described his works, such as Nicephorus Callistus and Nicholas Mesarites.

He created images of Pantocrator and Myrrhbearers in the now-demolished Church of the Holy Apostles in Constantinople.

Of his works, the most famed was mosaic in the dome with depiction of Christ Pantocrator.

Nicephorus Callistus' description of the painting:

Either Christ himself came down from heaven and showed the exact traits of his face to [the painter] or else the famous Eulalios mounted up to the very skies to paint with his skilled hand Christ's exact appearance.

Nicholas Mesarites' description of the painting:

[The dome] exhibits an image of the God-man Christ looking down, as it were, from the rim of heaven towards the floor of the church and everything that is in it. . .His head is in proportion to his body that is represented down to the navel, his eyes are joyful and welcoming to those who are not reproached by their conscience, but to those who are condemned by their own judgement, they are wrathful and hostile. . .The right hand blesses those who walk a straight path, while it admonishes those who do not and, as it were, checks them and turns them back from their disorderly course. The left hand with its fingers spread apart as possible, supports the Gospel.

== Bibliography ==
- Fred S. Kleiner and Christin J. Mamiya, Gardner's Art Through the Ages: Twelfth Edition (Wadsworth, 2005) ISBN 978-0-15-505090-7
