= Eutropius (historian) =

4th century Roman historian and official

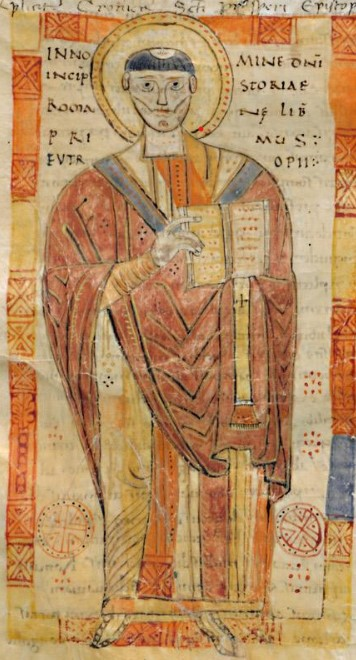
Portrait of Eutropius as a monk from a 10th-century manuscript (Laurentian Library Plut. 65.35)

Flavius Eutropius (fl. 363–387) was a Roman official and historian. His book Breviarium Historiae Romanae summarizes events from the founding of Rome in the 8th century BC down to the author's lifetime. Appreciated by later generations for its clear presentation and writing style, the Breviarium can be used as a supplement to more comprehensive Roman historical texts that have survived in fragmentary condition.

== Life ==
The exact background and birthplace of Eutropius is disputed. Some scholars claim he was born in Burdigala (Bordeaux) and was a man of medicine. Others, most notably Harold W. Bird, have dismissed these claims as being highly unlikely. Eutropius has been referred to as Italian in other sources and supposedly held estates in Asia. Aside from that, his name was Greek, making it unlikely he came from Gaul. Confusion about this has arisen because Eutropius was a popular name in late antiquity. Some believed him to have had Christian sympathies because in some manuscripts of his work he refers to Emperor Julian as an "excessive" persecutor of Christians, but this seems very unlikely. He was almost certainly a pagan and remained one under the emperor Julian's Christian successors.

He served as the imperial secretary (Latin: magister memoriae) in Constantinople. He accompanied Julian (r. 361–363) on his expedition against the Sassanids in 363. He survived at least as late as the reign of the emperor Valens (364–378), to whom he dedicated his Summary of Roman History. Eutropius may have been the same Eutropius that was proconsul, or Governor of Asia from 371 to 372. He may have also been the Praetorian Prefect of the Illyrian Provinces from 380 to 381, as well as possibly being a consul in 387.

== Breviarium Historiae Romanae ==
Eutropius's Summary of Roman History (Latin: Breviarium Historiae Romanae) or Summary from the Founding of Rome (Breviarium ab Urbe Condita) is a ten-chapter compendium of Roman history from its foundation to the short reign of Jovian. It was compiled with considerable care from the best accessible authorities. It was written in a clear and simple style, and it treats its subjects with general impartiality. The message of the book is simple, that Romans always overcome their problems. This theme became especially important after the Battle of Adrianople.

Eutropius stressed the importance of the Senate in his work. This is probably secret advice to Valens. For the Republican period, Eutropius depended upon an epitome of Livy. For the Empire, he appears to have used Suetonius and the now lost Enmannsche Kaisergeschichte, Enmann's History of the Emperors. At the end, he probably made use of his own personal experiences. The fact that the work ends with the reign of Jovian implies that it was written during the reign of either Valentinian I or Valens. If that was true, then the work would have been written between 364 and 378.

== Legacy ==
The independent value of his Summary is small, but it sometimes fills a gap left by the more authoritative records. It is particularly useful to historians for its account of the First Punic War, as no copy of Livy's original books for that period has survived.

Its stylistic and methodological virtues caused it to be much used by later Roman chroniclers. In particular, it received expanded editions by Paul the Deacon and Landolf Sagax, which repeated the original text and then continued it into the reigns of Justinian the Great and Leo the Armenian respectively. It was translated into Greek by Paeanius around 380 and by Capito Lycius in the 6th century. The former translation has survived almost in its entirety, the latter only as selected excerpts.

Although Eutropius's style contains some idiosyncrasies, the work's plain style made it long a favorite elementary Latin schoolbook. A scholarly edition was compiled by H. Droysen in 1879, which includes all that remains of both Greek versions and the expanded Latin editions of Paul and Landolf. There have been numerous English editions and translations, including Bird's.

Political offices
Preceded by Honorius; Flavius Euodius	Consul of the Roman Empire; 387 with Valentinian II	Succeeded by Magnus Maximus, Theodosius I, Maternus Cynegius
