= Alexandra of Antioch =

Greek noblewoman

Alexandra (Greek: Άλεξάνδρα, flourished 4th century) was a Greek noblewoman.

Little is known on the origins and life of Alexandra. Alexandra was from the city of Antioch and her brother was a certain Calliopius a rhetor who served as a grammaticus and assistant-teacher under Libanius, and later, ca. 388, served as a magister epistolarum in the imperial court.

Alexandra married a wealthy rhetor called Seleucus. Alexandra bore Seleucus two known children:

- Daughter Olympias, born in 361, who later became a great Christian saint. It is possible, however, that Olympias was the daughter of an otherwise unknown man named Seleucus.
- Either a son or daughter, who was a parent of Olympias and Seleucus

Alexandra is known as one of the correspondents from the surviving letters of Libanius as her husband was an intimate friend of Libanius, Julian and Calliopius. She was a cultivated woman, in which Libanius highly praised and admired her.

In 361 Alexandra remained in Antioch, while her husband was in Euphratensis, on imperial business on behalf of Constantius II and later Julian the Apostate. In 362, Alexandra accompanied Seleucus to Cilicia in Anatolia where Julian sent Seleucus there, as the emperor made him either high-priest or perhaps Roman governor in that province.

Libanius thanked Alexandra for slaves she sent to him as a gift, but bemoans the fact that they arrived without an accompanying letter. After this moment, no more is known of her.

== Sources ==
- Martindale, John R.; Jones, A. H. M.; Morris, John, eds. (1971). The Prosopography of the Later Roman Empire: Volume I, AD 260–395. Cambridge: Cambridge University Press. ISBN 0-521-07233-6.
- E.A. Wallis Budge, Paradise of the Holy Fathers Part 1, Kessinger Publishing, 2003
- P. Moret & B. Cabouret, Sertorius, Libanios, iconographie: a propos de Sertorius, journée d'étude, Toulouse, 7 avril 2000 [suivi de] autour de Libanios, culture et société dans l'antiquité tardive : actes de la table ronde, Avignon, 27 avril 2000, Presses Univ. du Mirail, 2003
- Selected Letters of Libanius: From the Age of Constantius and Julian, Liverpool University Press, 2004
