= Seleucus (son of Ablabius) =

4th century AD Greek rhetor

Seleucus also known as Flavius Seleucus and Count Seleucus (Greek: Σέλευκος; fl. 4th century AD) was a wealthy Greek rhetor who was a close friend of Libanius and the Roman emperor Julian.

== Family and early life ==
Seleucus was a Greek nobleman who was the son of the wealthy Cretan Flavius Ablabius, by an unnamed woman. His family was connected to the ruling Constantinian dynasty of the Roman Empire as his father served Constantine I. Ablabius was one of the most important senators of Constantinople; who held the praetorian prefecture of the East from 329 to 337/338 and served as consul in 331, who was active in public posts in both East and West. Seleucus had at least one known sibling a sister called Olympias, who was once engaged to Constantine I's son, the Roman emperor Constans who later married the Roman client king of Arsacid Armenia Arsaces II (Arshak II). Seleucus was born and raised either in Constantinople or Antioch, as his father during his political career was based in Antioch. His date of birth is unknown and little is known on his early life.

== Julian ==
Seleucus knew Julian since his student days as his friendship with the nephew of Constantine I and the Rhetor, historian Libanius went back to the early 350s. Seleucus is recorded being with Julian in Bithynia in c.353 and in 356, Libanius praises Seleucus of his eloquence in his Rhetoric. Although a Christian by birth, Seleucus became a zealous pagan of the ancient Greek religion who was a learned person.

In November 361, Julian succeeded his paternal cousin Constantius II as Roman emperor and ruled as sole emperor until June 26, 363. Seleucus under Julian's reign was made Comes by the emperor. In 361, Seleucus was sent to accompany the Praetorian prefect Priscianus to Euphratensis to do business as in the city, Seleucus held an administrative office as Priscianus was sent by the emperor to serve as role of governor in Euphratensis. In Euphratensis, Seleucus was a delegate of Priscianus as he was charged with levying uniforms and other supplies from the province. This was all for the upcoming Persian expedition that Julian's predecessor and later Julian had planned. In 362, Seleucus was sent by Julian to Cilicia in Anatolia, where the emperor made him either high-priest or perhaps Roman governor in that province. Seleucus accompanied Julian in his Persian expedition in 363 in which Seleucus intended to compose a history of the expedition.

== Life after Julian ==
Julian died in June 363 and Jovian succeeded Julian as Roman emperor. Jovian ruled as Roman emperor from 363 to 364. Sometime into Jovian's reign for unknown reasons and at an unknown date, Jovian dismissed Seleucus from his post and had him prosecuted, fined and exiled to Pontus. After that moment, there is no more known of Seleucus.

== Family and issue ==
Seleucus married an Antiochian Greek noblewoman called Alexandra. The brother of Alexandra, Calliopius, was a friend of Seleucus and was an assistant teacher with Libanius.

Alexandra bore Seleucus two known children:

- Daughter Olympias who later became a great Christian saint who was born sometime between 361 and 368
- Either a son or daughter, who was a parent of Olympias and Seleucus

== Sources ==
- De Imperatoribus Romanis - An Online Encyclopedia of Roman Emperors: Constans I (337-350 A.D.)
- Martindale, John R.; Jones, A. H. M.; Morris, John, eds. (1971). The Prosopography of the Later Roman Empire: Volume I, AD 260–395. Cambridge: Cambridge University Press. ISBN 0-521-07233-6.
- M.R. Salzman, The Making of a Christian Aristocracy: Social and Religious Change in the Western Roman Empire, Harvard University Press, 2002
- E.A. Wallis Budge, Paradise of the Holy Fathers Part 1, Kessinger Publishing, 2003
- P. Moret & B. Cabouret, Sertorius, Libanios, iconographie: a propos de Sertorius, journée d'étude, Toulouse, 7 avril 2000 [suivi de] autour de Libanios, culture et société dans l'antiquité tardive : actes de la table ronde, Avignon, 27 avril 2000, Presses Univ. du Mirail, 2003
- N. Lenski, Failure of Empire: Valens and the Roman State in the Fourth Century A.D., University of California Press, 2003
- Selected Letters of Libanius: From the Age of Constantius and Julian, Liverpool University Press, 2004
