= Ablabius (consul) =

Roman politician

Flavius Ablabius or Ablavius (Ancient Greek: Ἀβλάβιος; fl. 4th century AD, died 338) was a high official of the Roman Empire and contemporary of Emperor Constantine I (r. 306–337). and tutor to his son, Constantius II.

== Family and early life ==
Ablabius was a Greek from the island of Crete and a man of humble birth. When his mother was pregnant with him, she allegedly received a prophecy from an Egyptian astrologer about him, that she would almost have borne an emperor. His date of birth is unknown, the identities of his parents are unknown, and it is unknown whether he had any siblings or relatives and his early life is largely a mystery. Ablabius was of a non-aristocratic and non-senatorial background. Ablabius was at birth a pagan who converted later to Christianity and became one of the officials of the Roman governor of Crete. At some point, he left Crete and travelled to Constantinople to make his fortune.

== Constantine I and his family ==
After arriving at Constantinople, Ablabius by chance acquired great influence over the Roman emperor Constantine I and became one of the most important senators of Constantinople. Ablabius served as vicarius of the Diocese of Asia, held the praetorian prefecture of the East from 329 to 337/338, and served as ordinary consul in 331. Ablabius was active in the Roman East and West and during his political career, he was based at Antioch.

Considering his provincial background, Ablabius seemed to be attached to Constantine I, making him one of a small number of Easterners who held high offices throughout the Roman Empire. Ablabius convinced Constantine that the failure of grain supplies to arrive at Constantinople had been caused by the magical arts of the pagan sage Sopater of Apamea, who had verbally attacked the emperor and Ablabius for their dissolute behavior. Constantine followed the advice of Ablabius and had Sopater put to death. In 333, Constantine addressed a letter to Ablabius which is still preserved, in which he decreed that each party in a trial could appeal to a bishop's judgment.

In 336, Constantine ordered a Greek inscription carved on a pedestal of a statue representing himself in Antioch, where Ablabius is named with his fellow senators Lucius Papius Pacatianus, Valerius Felix, Annius Tiberianus and Nestorius Timonianus. Constantine also made Ablabius tutor and preceptor of his son Constantius II. When Constantine died in May 337, Constantius succeeded him. Later in 337, Ablabius sided with Athanasius of Alexandria, the Nicene Bishop of Alexandria who had powerful enemies at the court of the pro-Arian Constantius. Due to Ablabius’ support for Athanasius, Constantius dismissed him from the imperial court, and Ablabius retired to his estates in Bithynia. In 338, Constantius condemned Ablabius to death following false accusations of intending to usurp the throne; the emperor had him executed in front of his own house. His house in Constantinople later belonged to the Empress Galla Placidia.

== Family ==
Ablabius had married an unnamed noblewoman by whom he had two known children:

- A daughter, Olympia, also known as Olympias.
- A son, Seleucus. Through Seleucus, Ablabius would have further descendants. In particular, he would be the paternal grandfather of Saint Olympias the Deaconess.

Preceded by Gallicanus; Aurelius Valerius Tullianus Symmachus	Roman consul 331; With: Junius Bassus	Succeeded by L. Papius Pacatianus; Mecilius Hilarianus
Preceded by Constantius	Praetorian prefect of the East; 329–337/338	Succeeded by Septimius Acindynus
