= Dadastana =

Inland town of Ancient Bithynia

Coordinates: 40°11′46″N 31°06′34″E

Dadastana (Ancient Greek: Δαδάστανα) was an inland town of ancient Bithynia. The Tabula Peutingeriana places it on a road from Nicaea to Juliopolis, and 29 M. P. from Juliopolis. It appears to have been near the borders of Bithynia and Galatia, as Ammianus says. The emperor Jovianus on his return from the East came from Ancyra to Dadastana, where he died suddenly.

Its site is located near Karahisar, Asiatic Turkey.
