= Historia Acephala =

Anonymous 4th century ecclesiastical chronicle

The Historia Acephala ("Headless History") is an anonymous 4th or early 5th century ecclesiastical chronicle primarily concerning the Patriarchate of Alexandria and the activities of Athanasius. Despite the poor condition of the manuscript it has survived in, the work is valuable for its exceptional chronological accuracy. (Note: Annik Martin, ed. (1985). "Historie "Acéphale" et Index Syriaque des Lettres Festales D'Athanase D'Alexandrie". Sources Chrétiennes (317). Translated by Micheline Albert. Paris: Cerf. (French translation))^{:p. 21} (Note: Schaff, Philip; Wace, Henry, eds. (1995) [1892]. "Historia Acephala and Festal Index". Nicene and Post-Nicene Fathers. Vol. IV: 4: Athanasius: Select Works and Letters, Second Series. Translated by Archibald Robertson. Hendrickson. ISBN 9781565631205. (English translation))^{:p. 495 f.}

Editors have put forward several theories as to the date of the work's composition: Some editors hold that it was originally written in 368 for the 40th anniversary of Athanasius' election and that later chroniclers inserted additional information. Others argue that it was composed some time during Theophilus' tenure as bishop, i.e. between 384 and 412 AD. (Note: Heinz Fromen (1914). Athanasii historia acephala. Münster: Universitätsbuchdruckerei Johannes Bredt. (Original Latin))^{:p. 63-65} The work was originally written in Greek, but survives only in a single 8th century unical quarto containing a partial Latin translation. While the original text appears to have covered Athanasius' entire episcopacy (i.e. from 328), the surviving version only covers the years between 346 and 373 in detail, with a small portion mentioning Athanasius' successors Peter II, Timothy I, and Theophilus. The manuscript was discovered in Verona by Scipione Maffei in 1738, who gave the then-unknown chronicle the title Historia Acephala in reference to the missing first section of the work.^{:p. 22}

The Historia Acaphala is an important source for clarifying the often confused chronology of Athanasius' life and career. Its usefulness is thanks, in large part, to the unusual diligence and accuracy of the annalist: editor Archibald Robertson writes, "The Latin text [...] is very imperfect, but the annalist is so careful in his reckonings, and so often repeats himself, that the careful reader can nearly always use the document to make good its own gaps or wrong readings."^{:p. 21} ^{:p. 495} The work was used by the 5th century church historians Sozomen and Theodoret, perhaps in its original state.
