= Seleucus of Alexandria =

Seleucus of Alexandria (Ancient Greek: Σέλευκος ὁ Ἀλεξανδρεύς) was a Roman-era grammarian. He was nicknamed 'Homeric'. He was a sophist in Rome (Second Sophistic era). He commented on pretty well all the poets, wrote a number of exegetical and miscellaneous works, the titles of which are listed in the Suda. There are some other in significant persons of this name. (See Vossius, de Hist. Graec. p. 496, ed. Westermann; Fabric. Bibl. Graec. vol. i. pp. 86, 184, n., 522, vol. ii. p. 27, vol. iv. p. 10'6, vol. v. p. 107, vol. vi. p. 378.)

== Works ==
According to the Suda, Seleucus wrote the following works (all lost):

- On Differences between Synonyms (Περὶ τῆς ἐν συνωνύμοις διαφορᾶς)
- On Things Believed Falsely (Περὶ τῶν ψευδῶς πεπιστευμένων)
- On Proverbs of the Alexandrians (Περὶ τῶν παρ' Ἀλεξανδρεῦσι παροιμιῶν)
- On Gods (Περὶ θεῶν, in 100 books)
