= Jovian (emperor) =

Roman emperor from 363 to 364

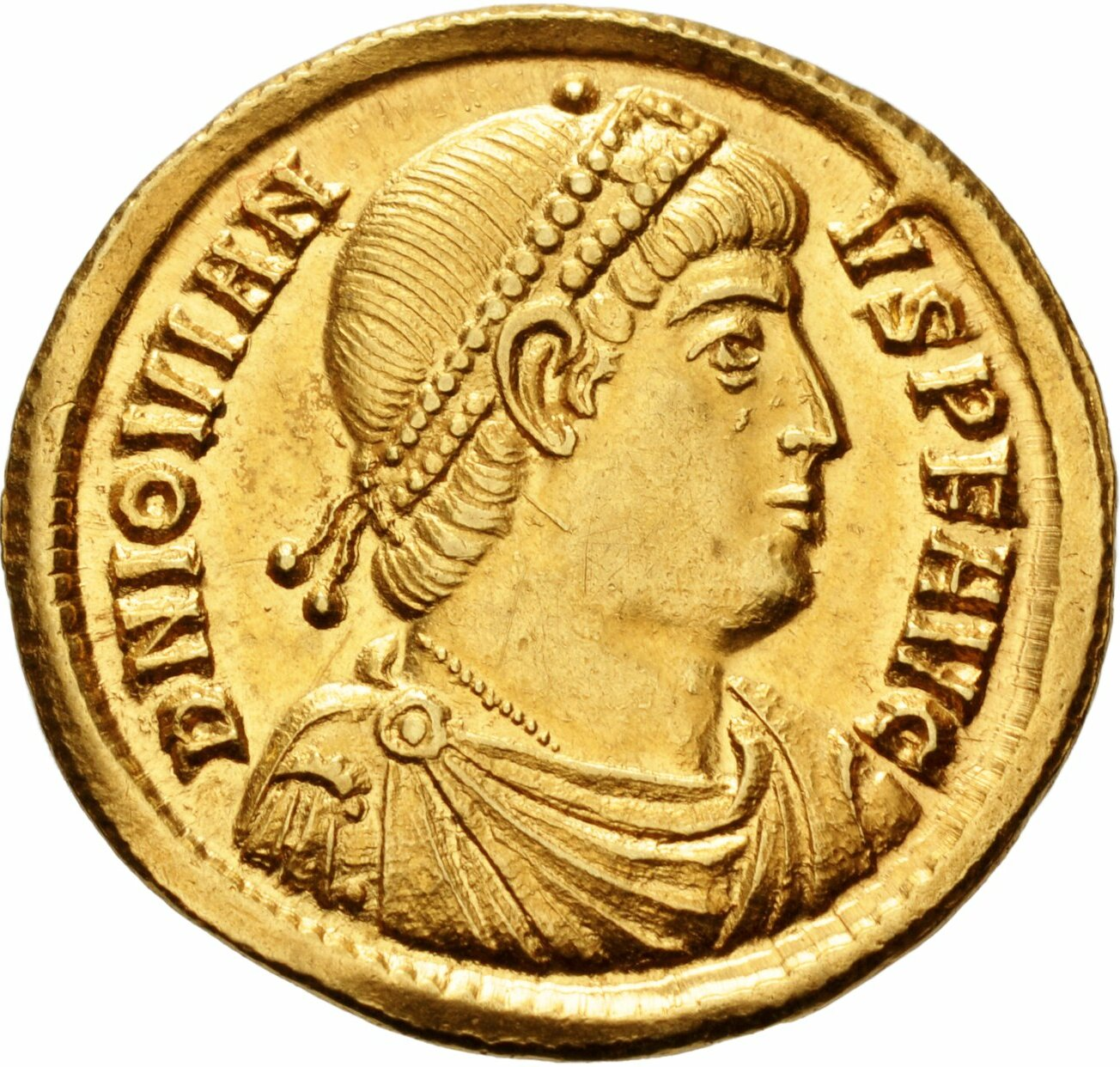
- Solidus of Jovian, inscribed: d n iovianus p f aug

Roman emperor
- Reign: 27 June 363 – 17 February 364
- Predecessor: Julian
- Successor: Valentinian I (West); Valens (East)
- Born: 331; Singidunum, Moesia Superior, Roman Empire
- Died: 17 February 364 (aged 33); Dadastana, Anatolia, Roman Empire
- Burial: Church of the Holy Apostles, Constantinople
- Spouse: Charito
- Issue: Varronianus another son
Names
- Flavius Jovianus (Note: Jovian may have adopted the nomen "Flavius" in an attempt to claim descent from the Constantinian dynasty. The name is only attested in a few inscriptions. One in particular calls him "Flavius Claudius Iovianus", though this could be a confusion with his predecessor, Flavius Claudius Iulianus. From this point onwards the name "Flavius" began to be used as a status marker rather than personal name.)
- Father: Varronianus
- Religion: Nicene Christianity

Jovian (/ˈdʒoʊviən/; Latin: Jovianus; Greek: Ἰοβιανός Iobianós; 331 – 17 February 364) was Roman emperor from June 363 to February 364. As part of the imperial bodyguard, he accompanied Julian on his Persian expedition. Julian was killed in battle, and the exhausted and ill-provisioned Roman army declared Jovian his successor. Unable to cross the Tigris, Jovian made peace with the Sasanian Empire on humiliating terms. He spent the rest of his seven-month reign traveling back towards Constantinople, but died at Dadastana without reaching the capital city.

Jovian was a Christian, whose accession ended the imperial endorsement of polytheism briefly revived under Julian; during a stop in Edessa he received petitions from bishops over doctrinal issues. He was also the third-to-last emperor to govern the empire as a single polity, and the last to do so for the whole of his reign. (Note: After Jovian, Valentinian I ruled 1 month alone, and Theodosius 4 months.) From his successor Valentinian I to the fall of the Western Roman Empire, all subsequent administrations involved co-emperors governing a territory split into jurisdictions of the East and West.

== Early life and accession ==
Jovian was born at Singidunum, Moesia Superior (today Belgrade in Serbia), in 331, son of Varronianus, the commander of Constantius II's imperial bodyguards (comes domesticorum). He also joined the guards and in this capacity in 361, escorted Constantius' remains to the Church of the Holy Apostles. Jovian was married to Charito and they had two sons, Varronianus, and another whose name is unknown.

In 363 Jovian accompanied the Emperor Julian on the Mesopotamian campaign against Shapur II, the Sassanid king. At the Battle of Samarra, a small but decisive engagement, Julian was mortally wounded. Ammianus Marcellinus reports that the dying emperor declined to name his preferred successor, fearful that he either might overlook a worthy candidate, or put his desired candidate in danger of power-hungry nobles. Julian died on 26 June 363. The next day, the army offered the throne to the aged Saturninius Secundus Salutius, praetorian prefect of the Orient, who refused it. Instead, and in spite of Julian's reinstitution of paganism, the army chose the Christian Jovian, senior officer of the Scholae, as emperor.

== Reign ==
On the very morning of his accession, Jovian resumed the retreat begun by Julian. Though harassed by the Sasanians, the army succeeded in reaching the city of Dura on the banks of the Tigris. Unable to bridge the river and reach Roman lands on the western bank, Jovian was forced to sue for a peace treaty on humiliating terms. In exchange for an unhindered retreat to his own territory, he agreed to a thirty-year truce, a withdrawal from the five Roman provinces, Arzamena, Moxoeona, Azbdicena, Rehimena and Corduena, and to allow the Sasanians to occupy the fortresses of Nisibis, Castra Maurorum and Singara. The Romans also surrendered their interests in the Kingdom of Armenia to the Sasanians. The king of Armenia, Arsaces II, was to receive no help from Rome. The treaty was widely seen as a disgrace.

After crossing the Tigris, Jovian sent an embassy to the West to announce his elevation. With the treaty signed, Jovian and his army marched to Nisibis, whose populace were given three days to leave before the city was handed over to the Sasanians.

In September 363 Jovian arrived at Edessa where he issued two edicts. The first, a limitation on the distance a soldier could be sent for straw, was to indicate an end to the war with Sasanid Persia. The second was the restoration of estates of the res privata to the Imperial finances following Julian's incorporating them to pagan temples.

Jovian's arrival at Antioch in October 363, was met with an enraged populace. Faced with offensive graffiti and insulting authorless bills (famosi) throughout the city, he ordered the Library of Antioch to be burned down. (Note: Eunapius states that Jovian was incited by his wife to burn the library of Antioch. Ammianus Marcellinus, Zonaras and Philostorgius make no mention of the burning of the library during Jovian's stay.) Jovian left Antioch in November 363, (Note: Curran states Jovian left Antioch in late October 363.) headed for Constantinople. By December 363 he was at Ancyra, where he proclaimed his infant son, Varronianus, consul.

The journey ended prematurely on 17 February 364, (Note: Socrates gives 17 February, while the Consularia Const. gives 19 February. Most scholars use Socrates' date.) when Jovian was found dead in his tent at Dadastana, halfway between Ancyra and Nicaea. His death, which went uninvestigated, was possibly the result of suffocating on poisonous fumes seeping from the newly painted bedchamber walls by a brazier. (Note: Ammianus Marcellinus suggests his death was due to strangulation.) Jovian died aged 33 and was buried in the Church of the Holy Apostles in Constantinople, in a porphyry sarcophagus. (Note: This sarcophagus was described in the 10th century by Constantine VII Porphyrogenitus in the De Ceremoniis.) He was succeeded by the brothers Valentinian I and Valens, who divided the empire between them. Seeking to remove any threats to their position, they blinded Varronianus; according to John Chrysostom, Charito was spared but lived the rest of her life in fear.

== Restoration of Christianity ==
Jovian was met at Edessa by a group of bishops, including Athanasius, (Note: Rufinus of Aquileia states Athanasius was summoned by Jovian.) who was newly returned from exile. The Semi-Arian bishops received a poor greeting, while Athanasius delivered a letter to Jovian insisting on the Nicene Creed and the rejection of Arianism. Athanasius was restored to his episcopal duties, and allowed to accompany Jovian to Antioch.

Upon his arrival in the city, Jovian received a letter from the Synod of Antioch, imploring for Meletius' restoration as bishop. By September 363, Jovian restored the labarum ("Chi-Rho") as the army's standard and revoked the edicts of Julian against Christians, but did not close any pagan temples. (Note: Curran cites the Historia Acephala for a claim that Jovian made Christianity the official religion of the empire, but Salzman indicates that the notice is mistaken.) He issued an edict of toleration, granting his subjects full liberty of conscience, but also banned magic and divination. Despite supporting the Nicene doctrines, he passed no edicts against Arians. Philostorgius, an Arian church historian, stated, "The Emperor Jovian restored the churches to their original uses, and set them free from all the vexatious persecutions inflicted on them by the Apostate Julian."

== See also ==
- List of Roman emperors
- List of Byzantine emperors

== Sources ==
- Anatolios, Khaled (2004). Athanasius. Routledge. ISBN 978-0415202039.
- Barker, John W. (1966). Justinian and the Later Roman Empire. University of Wisconsin Press. ISBN 978-0299039448.
- Baynes, Norman H. (1967). "Constantine's Successors to Jovian: And the Struggle with Persia". In Gwatkin, H.M.; Whitney, J.P. (eds.). The Cambridge Medieval History. Vol. I. Cambridge at the University Press. pp. 55–86. ISBN 9781463690311.
- Browning, Robert (1976). The Emperor Julian. University of California Press. ISBN 0-520-03731-6.
- Curran, John (1998). "From Jovian to Theodosius". In Cameron, Averil; Garnsey, Peter (eds.). The Cambridge Ancient History: The Late Empire, A.D. 337-425. Vol. XIII (2nd ed.). Cambridge University Press. pp. 78–110. ISBN 978-0521302005.
- Cameron, Alan (1988). "Flavius: a Nicety of Protocol". Latomus. 47 (1): 26–33. JSTOR 41540754.
- Drijvers, Jan Willem (2018). "Jovian between History and Myth". In Burgersdijk, Diederik W.P.; Ross, Alan J. (eds.). Imagining Emperors in the Later Roman Empire. Brill. pp. 234–256. ISBN 9789004370890.
- Drijvers, Jan Willem (2022). The Forgotten Reign of the Emperor Jovian. Oxford University Press. ISBN 9780197600702.
- Elm, Susanna (2012). Sons of Hellenism, Fathers of the Church: Emperor Julian, Gregory of Nazianzus, and the Vision of Rome. University of California Press. ISBN 978-0520269309.
- Elton, Hugh (2018). The Roman Empire in Late Antiquity: A Political and Military History. Cambridge University Press. ISBN 978-0521899314.
- Frend, W.H.C. (2003). The Early Church: From the Beginnings to 461. SCM Press. ISBN 978-0334029090.
- Gwynn, David M. (2012). Athanasius of Alexandria: Bishop, Theologian, Ascetic, Father. Oxford University Press. ISBN 978-0199210954.
- Heather, Peter (1999). "Ammianus on Jovian: history and literature". In Drijvers, Jan Willem; Hunt, David (eds.). The Late Roman World and Its Historian: Interpreting Ammianus Marcellinus. Routledge. p. 93-103. ISBN 0-415-20271-X.
- Jones, Arnold Hugh Martin (1986). The Later Roman Empire, 284-602: A Social Economic and Administrative Survey. Vol. 1 (2nd ed.). Johns Hopkins University Press. ISBN 978-0801833533.
- Jones, A. H. M.; Martindale, J. R.; Morris, John (2001). The Prosopography of the Later Roman Empire: AD 260-395. Vol. 1 (5th ed.). Cambridge University Press. ISBN 0-521-07233-6.
- Lenski, Noel (2002). Failure of Empire: Valens and the Roman State in the Fourth Century A.D. University of California Press. ISBN 978-0520-23332-4.
- Moffatt, Ann; Tall, Maxeme (2012). Constantine Porphyrogennetos - The Book of Ceremonies. Brill. ISBN 978-18-76-50342-0.
- Ostrogorsky, George (1995). History of the Byzantine State (4th ed.). Rutgers University Press. ISBN 978-0813505992.
- Rohmann, Dirk (2016). Christianity, Book-Burning and Censorship in Late Antiquity. Walter de Gruyter GmbH. ISBN 978-3-11-048445-8.
- Rufinus of Aquileia (2016). History of the Church. Translated by Amidon, Philip R. The Catholic University of America Press. ISBN 9780813229027.
- Salzman, Michele Renee (2002). The Making of a Christian Aristocracy: Social and Religious Change in the Western Roman Empire. Cambridge, MA: Harvard University Press. ISBN 0-674-00641-0.
- Tougher, Shaun (2018). "Jovian". In Nicholson, Oliver (ed.). The Oxford Dictionary of Late Antiquity. Oxford: Oxford University Press. ISBN 978-0-19-866277-8.
- Treadgold, Warren (1997). A History of the Byzantine State and Society. Stanford University Press. ISBN 9780804726306.
- Vasiliev, A. A. (1948). "Imperial Porphyry Sarcophagi in Constantinople" (PDF). Dumbarton Oaks Papers. 4: 3–26. doi:10.2307/1291047. JSTOR 1291047.
- Vasiliev, Alexander (1980). History of the Byzantine Empire. Vol. I (2nd ed.). The University of Wisconsin Press. ISBN 0-299-80925-0.
- Watts, Edward J. (2015). The Final Pagan Generation. University of California Press. ISBN 978-0-520-28370-1.
- Wood, Philip (2010). 'We Have No King But Christ': Christian Political Thought in Greater Syria on the Eve of the Arab Conquest (c.400–585). Oxford University Press.

Regnal titles
Preceded by Julian	Roman emperor 363–364	Succeeded by Valentinian I
Political offices
Preceded by Julian IV; Sallustinus	Roman consul 364 with Varronianus	Succeeded by Valentinian I Valens
