= Sallustia gens =

Ancient Roman family

The gens Sallustia, occasionally written Salustia, was a plebeian family at ancient Rome. Members of this gens are first mentioned in the time of Cicero, and from that time they attained particular distinction as statesmen and writers. The most illustrious of the family was the historian Gaius Sallustius Crispus, who wrote valuable works on the Jugurthine War and the Conspiracy of Catiline, which still exist.

== Praenomina ==
The main praenomina of the Sallustii of the Republic and early Empire were Gaius, Gnaeus, and Publius. Other names appear in imperial times, including Marcus and Quintus. All of these were among the most common names throughout Roman history.

== Branches and cognomina ==
The only cognomen borne by the Sallustii of the Republic was Crispus, belonging to an abundant class of surnames derived from the physical features of an individual, and originally belonging to someone with curly hair. Passienus, borne by some of the Sallustii during the early decades of the Empire, was a gentile name inherited from the paternal line when one of the Passieni was adopted by his granduncle, the historian Sallust, becoming part of his gens. Lucullus, borne by an ill-fated member of this family in the time of Domitian, may have been derived from lucus, a grove, although it might also have been a diminutive of the praenomen Lucius.

== Members ==
This list includes abbreviated praenomina. For an explanation of this practice, see filiation.

- Gnaeus Sallustius, a talented writer whom Cicero numbered among his clients.
- Gnaeus Sallustius, (Note: Given as Caninius Sallustius, which some editors proposed amending to either Gnaeus Sallustius, Gaius Annius Sallustius, or Caninius Sallustianus.) a proquaestor serving under Lucius Calpurnius Bibulus, proconsul of Syria, in 51 BC. He wrote to Cicero to inquire about certain matters as he was arriving in the province, and Cicero departing, and he requested a letter of recommendation to Bibulus, which Cicero supplied.
- Publius Sallustius, the intended recipient of thirty sestertii which Cicero received from his client, Gnaeus Sallustius. As Cicero was at Brundisium, he asked his good friend Atticus to pay the sum to Publius as soon as possible.
- Publius Sallustius Blaesus, consul suffectus in AD 89, serving for the months of May to August. He was a member of the Arval Brethren, attested in inscriptions from 78 to 91.
- Sallustius Lucullus, governor of Britain in the reign of Domitian, who had him put to death, ostensibly because he referred to a new variety of spear as lucullae, naming them after himself. He had probably been consul, as all of his predecessors had been, perhaps around AD 87.
- Sallustius Fulvianus, a friend of Lucius Verus and Marcus Cornelius Fronto, whom Verus refers to in a letter to Fronto concerning his actions in the Parthian War, explaining that Fulvianus will furnish Fronto with copies of the despatches that Verus had received from his commanders.
- Marcus Sallustius Rufus Titilianus, probably a nobilis, whose name was found on a lead pipe at Rome.
- Sallustia Calvina, evidently a noblewoman, manumitted a slave who became Gaius Sallustius.
- Gaius Sallustius Ɔ. l., freedman of Sallustia Calvina.
- Sallustia Frontina, a woman of a senatorial family, named in a funerary inscription from Rome.
- Sallustia Lucana, a noblewoman, employed Athictus Threptus as keeper of stores.
- Quintus Sallustius Macrinianus, a Roman senator, and the grandfather of the Macrinianus who was governor of Mauretania.
- Lucius Vespronius Candidus Sallustius Sabinianus, consul suffectus about AD 176.
- Quintus Sallustius Q. f. Macrinianus, a senator like his father, was father of the governor Macrianus.
- Sallustius Verginius Gallus, consul suffectus in AD 197 or 198.
- Quintus Sallustius Q. f. Q. n. Macrianus, a Roman senator like his father and grandfather, Macrianus was governor of Mauretania about the time of Caracalla, early in the third century.
- Titus Flavius Sallustius Paelignianus, consul in AD 231.
- Publius Sallustius Sempronius Victor, a procurator in Mauretania Caesariensis during the reigns of Severus Alexander and Maximinus Thrax, erected new milestones, including ones at Ad Aras, Altava, and Sertei.
- Sallustia Plotina, wife of the senator Titus Desticius Juba, and mother of Desticius Sallustius Juba and Jubae.
- Gaius Julius Sallustius Saturninus Fortunatianus, consul suffectus in an uncertain year before AD 262.
- Julius Sallustius, consul in AD 344, sine collega from April or May.
- Flavius Sallustius, praetorian prefect of Gaul from AD 361 to 363, and consul in 363, alongside the emperor Julian. Although a pagan himself, Sallustius dissuaded the emperor from undertaking a persecution of the Christians.
- Sallustius, a contemporary of Julian, and the author of a Neoplatonic treatise, Περι θεων και Κoσμου (Peri Theon kai Kosmou, On the Gods and the Cosmos). He might be the same as the praetorian prefect.
- Sallustius of Emesa, a Cynic philosopher of the later fifth century. In his youth he had studied law, then become a sophist, taking up Neoplatonism; but he later rejected its doctrines and embraced Cynicism.

=== Sallustii Crispi ===
- Gaius Sallustius Crispus, the historian, was quaestor about 55 BC, tribune of the plebs in 52, and praetor in 46. During the Civil War he espoused the side of Caesar, who appointed him governor of Numidia, from which Sallust retired a wealthy man, and devoted himself to writing history.
- Sallustia, sister of the historian and grandmother Passienus who was adopted by her brother.
- Gaius Sallustius C. f. Crispus Passienus, the son of Lucius Passienus Rufus, consul in 4 BC, was adopted by his granduncle, the historian Sallust. He became one of the most trusted friends and advisors to Augustus, and afterward Tiberius, without ever seeking political office or achieving senatorial rank.
- Gaius Sallustius C. f. C. n. Crispus Passienus, consul in AD 27, and again in 44. Having inherited great wealth, he cleverly avoided the intrigues of the imperial court, maintaining the favour of Tiberius, Caligula, and Claudius; but hoping to rehabilitate his niece, Agrippina, Claudius ordered Passienus to divorce his wife and marry Agrippina. He is generally thought to have perished by Agrippina's hand, through poison, about AD 47.

== See also ==
- List of Roman gentes
- Sallust (disambiguation)

== Bibliography ==
- Marcus Tullius Cicero, Epistulae ad Atticum, Epistulae ad Familiares, Epistulae ad Quintum Fratrem.
- Quintus Horatius Flaccus (Horace), Satirae (Satires), Carmina (Odes).
- Lucius Annaeus Seneca (Seneca the Younger), De Clementia (On Clemency).
- Gaius Plinius Secundus (Pliny the Elder), Historia Naturalis (Natural History).
- Publius Cornelius Tacitus, Annales.
- Gaius Suetonius Tranquillus, De Vita Caesarum (Lives of the Caesars, or The Twelve Caesars), De Illustribus Grammaticis (On the Illustrious Grammarians), De Viris Illustribus (Lives of Famous Men).
- Appianus Alexandrinus (Appian), Bellum Civile (The Civil War).
- Marcus Cornelius Fronto, Epistulae ad Verum (Letters to Lucius Verus).
- Aulus Gellius, Noctes Atticae (Attic Nights).
- Cassius Dio, Roman History.
- Simplicius of Cilicia, Commentarius in Enchiridion Epicteti (Commentary on the Enchiridion of Epictetus).
- Photius, Bibliotheca.
- Suda.
- Wilhelm Drumann, Geschichte Roms in seinem Übergang von der republikanischen zur monarchischen Verfassung, oder: Pompeius, Caesar, Cicero und ihre Zeitgenossen, Königsberg (1834–1844).
- Dictionary of Greek and Roman Biography and Mythology, William Smith, ed., Little, Brown and Company, Boston (1849).
- Theodor Mommsen et alii, Corpus Inscriptionum Latinarum (The Body of Latin Inscriptions, abbreviated CIL), Berlin-Brandenburgische Akademie der Wissenschaften (1853–present).
- René Cagnat et alii, L'Année épigraphique (The Year in Epigraphy, abbreviated AE), Presses Universitaires de France (1888–present).
- George Davis Chase, "The Origin of Roman Praenomina", in Harvard Studies in Classical Philology, vol. VIII, pp. 103–184 (1897).
- T. Robert S. Broughton, The Magistrates of the Roman Republic, American Philological Association (1952–1986).
- Edward Champlin, "Hadrian's Heir", in Zeitschrift für Papyrologie und Epigraphik, vol. 21 (1976).
- Géza Alföldy, Konsulat und Senatorenstand unter der Antonien (The Consulate and Senatorial State under the Antonines), Rudolf Habelt, Bonn (1977).
- Paul A. Gallivan, "The Fasti for A.D. 70–96", in Classical Quarterly, vol. 31, pp. 186–220 (1981).
- Paul M. M. Leunissen, Konsuln und Konsulare in der Zeit von Commodus bis Severus Alexander (Consuls and Consulars from the Time of Commodus to Severus Alexander), Verlag Gieben, Amsterdam, (1989).
