= Mardonius (philosopher) =

Goth-Roman rhetorician, philosopher and educator

[Mardonius] was of all men most responsible for my way of life

— Julian

Mardonius, also spelled Mardonios, was a Roman rhetorician, philosopher and educator of Gothic descent. Mardonius was the childhood tutor and adviser of the 4th century Roman emperor Julian, on whom he had an immense influence.

== Life ==
Mardonius was a eunuch of Gothic origin. He was probably a lifelong pagan. He grew up as a slave in the household of Julius Julianus, who was the praetorian prefect of Licinius. Julianus trained him from an early age to become a scholar. During this time Mardonius acquired extensive knowledge of Greek poetry and philosophy. Mardonius was particularly influenced by the world of Homer, which he contrasted with the decadence of contemporary society. He was the teacher of his master's daughter Basilina. In 330, Basilina would marry Julius Constantius, the half-brother of Constantine the Great, who had defeated Licinius and seized control of the entire Roman Empire. The couple had one son, the later emperor Julian.

While Basilina died of natural causes, Julius Constantius was murdered after the death of Constantine the Great. Since 338, Julian lived in the household of his grandfather, with Mardonius as his tutor. Emperor Constantius II issued an imperial decree that Julian was not to be instructed in ancient Greek philosophy, but Mardonius ignored this order. The seven-year-old orphan Julian and Mardonius developed a close emotional bond. Mardonius introduced Julian to Socrates, Plato and Aristotle, and to the works of Homer, which Julian particularly enjoyed. Mardonius functioned not only as his academic teacher, but also as a moral tutor, the "guardian of his virtue", as the rhetorician Libanius put it. He took great care in bringing up Julian in accordance with his own conservative beliefs and principles, seeking to infuse the young prince with the Homeric virtue of simplicity. Mardonius had a particular disdain for entertainment, and because of this, Julian did not attend theaters or horse races until he reached adulthood. He also instructed Julian to walk modestly, with his eyes fixed on the ground, in contrast to the swaggery fashionable with Roman elites at the time. It is likely that the influence of Mardonius contributed to Julian's later decision to abandon Christianity.

Julian’s freedom as a student had a powerful influence on him and ensured that for the first time in a century the future emperor would be a man of culture.

— E. Christian Kopff

Julian was separated from Mardonius at the age of 11, an event which he considered one of the most painful of his life. Mardonius was one of Julian's few personal friends, and after Julian assumed the position of emperor, became one of his advisers, frequently visiting him for dinner in Constantinople.

Mardonius is mentioned in several works by Julian, in particular his satire "Misopogon" ("Beard-Hater"). In the funeral oration on Julian, Libanius mentioned the positive influence Mardonius had on his pupil.

== Quotations ==
- "Never let the crowd of your playmates flocking to the theaters lead you astray so that you crave such spectacles. Do you long for horse races? There is one very cleverly described in Homer. Take up the book and study it!"

== Quotes about Mardonius ==
- [Mardonius] is the most responsible of all for my way of life ... Plato, Socrates, Aristotle and Theophrastus. They convinced this old man, in his folly, and later, when he found me, since I was young and a lover of literature, he convinced me in turn that if I should strive to imitate these men in every respect, I would become better, perhaps not than other men, for the contest was not with them, but better than my former self." – Julian
- "My pedagog taught me to keep my eyes on the ground as I went to school. And I never saw a theater until I had more hair on my chin than I did on my head, and even at that age I never went of my own accord or will ..." – Julian
- "[Mardonius was] the best phylax of temperance" – Libanius
- "As a mature man Julian seems to grow almost tender when recalling him, as if he were recalling the fondest remembrance of his childhood. Among so many memories of blood and outrage only that of Mardonius came to the emperor's mind like a beam of light shining in darkness, and he spoke of him with the affection which he might have employed in speaking of his mother." – Giuseppe Ricciotti
- "The personality of Mardonius, who left a decisive mark on Julian's character, can easily be brought to life thanks to all the details his pupil gives about him ... Through his occupation with literature, he came to discover an ideal world – one which indeed provided a substitute for everyday reality to many a more talented and fortunate contemporary. Little by little, he withdrew in the world that Homer had created, and sincerely despised all that lay without its boundaries. When Julian was entrusted to his care, Mardonius infected his pupil with this enthusiasm, while for his part Julian showed an absolute trust in his new master who, at that moment, was the only person capable of reproducing for the orphan something of the atmosphere of home life ... Himself indifferent to worldly pleasures and despising all the tawdry honours attached to social position, Mardonius took great care to shape his pupil's moral upbringing according to his own beliefs and principles. His ambition was to make the young prince able to appreciate the grandeur of simplicity." – Polymnia Athanassiadi

== Sources ==
- Athanassiadi, Polymnia (2014). Julian (Routledge Revivals): An Intellectual Biography. Routledge. ISBN 978-1317696520.
- Desmond, William (2011). Philosopher-Kings of Antiquity. Bloomsbury Publishing. ISBN 978-1441108821.
- Kisch, Jonathan (2005). God Against the Gods: The History of the War Between Monotheism and Polytheism. Penguin Books. ISBN 1440626588.
- Ricciotti, Giuseppe (1999). Julian the Apostate: Roman Emperor (361-363). TAN Books. ISBN 1505104548.
- de Vries, Nanny M. W.; Best, Jan (2011). "Thamyris Vol 1.2". Thamyris Intersecting. Rodopi. ISSN 1381-1312.
