= Sallust (disambiguation) =

The names Sallustius/Saloustios and their vernacular variants Sallust(e) have been borne by many people:

- Sallust or Gaius Sallustius Crispus, historian of the 1st century BC
  - Gardens of Sallust
- Gaius Sallustius Passienus Crispus, 1st-century AD Roman notable
- Sallustius Lucullus, 1st-century AD governor of Roman Britain
- Seius Sallustius, 3rd-century usurper
- Sallustius (Neoplatonist), a writer who might be the same as either:
  - Flavius Sallustius, 4th-century Hispano-Roman statesman, consul and praetorian prefect of Gaul
  - Saturninus Secundus Salutius, 4th-century Gallo-Roman statesman, praetorian prefect of the Orient
- Sallustius of Emesa, 5th-century Cynic philosopher
- Guillaume de Salluste Du Bartas, 16th-century French Protestant epic poet
- Salluste Duval, 19th-century Canadian inventor

== See also ==
- Sallust (horse), (1969-87), thoroughbred racehorse
- House of Sallust, in the ancient Roman city of Pompeii
