= Chalcedon tribunal =

Tribunal for Roman emperor held in West Asia

Shortly after the death of Roman emperor Constantius II, his successor Julian held a tribunal at the city of Chalcedon, which was then a suburb of Constantinople. Saturninius Secundus Salutius, who was raised to the rank of Praetorian Prefect was given the chief oversight and with him were associated Claudius Mamertinus (another civilian), and four military commanders, Arbitio, Agilo, Nevitta and Jovinus. The first two were ex-officers of Constantius, while the other two had served with Julian.

At this tribunal a large part of Constantius's ministers were brought to trial. In charge of the daily inquisitions was Arbitio, "while the others were present merely for show" according to historian Ammianus Marcellinus. Palladius, Taurus, Euagrius, Saturninus and Cyrinus are known to have been exiled. Florentius, Ursulus and Eusebius were condemned to death. Apodemius and Paulus Catena were even burned alive. Another Florentius was imprisoned on a Dalmatian island. Constantius II died on 3 November 361, so all this must have happened in late 361 and early 362.
