= Nevitta =

4th-century Roman military leader

Flavius Nevitta (fl. 357-363) was a military leader and official in the Roman Empire. His career is closely linked to that of Flavius Claudius Julianus, the Emperor Julian. He was master of the cavalry and in 362 served as consul.

== Life ==
An officer of Frankish ancestry, Nevitta is first mentioned regarding a battle against the Alamanni who had been pillaging the region of Raetia in 357. The Romans were led by Barbatio and Ammianus Marcellinus writes that "Nevitta, commander of a troop of cavalry and afterwards consul, was present and conducted himself manfully." In 361 Julian promoted Nevitta to the rank of magister equitum.

When Julian decided to move against Constantius in a bid for power, Nevitta was one of his two generals, the other being Jovinus. The bulk of Julian's force was divided between these two. It was Nevitta's task to lead his army through Raetia and then guard the pass of Succi, thus protecting Julian's rear as the Caesar moved on to Constantinople. Ammianus took the opportunity to describe Nevitta at this point in his career: "a man neither in high birth, experience nor renown comparable with those on whom Constantius conferred the highest magistracy, but on the contrary somewhat boorish, and (what was more intolerable) cruel in his high office."

When the emperor Julian set up a tribunal at Chalcedon to try those involved in the excesses of the previous government, Nevitta was appointed as one of the judges. In January 362 he was appointed as consul along with Claudius Mamertinus. The following year Nevitta accompanied Julian on his Parthian expedition. With the death of his emperor no further mention is found of Nevitta.

== Sources ==
- Martindale, John R.; Jones, A. H. M.; Morris, John, eds. (1971). "Flavius Nevitta". The Prosopography of the Later Roman Empire: Volume I, AD 260–395. Cambridge: Cambridge University Press. pp. 626–627. ISBN 0-521-07233-6.

Political offices
Preceded by Taurus, Florentius	Consul of the Roman Empire; 362 with Claudius Mamertinus	Succeeded by Flavius Claudius Iulianus Augustus IV, Sallustius
