= Canons Regular of the Lateran =

Catholic religious order

The Canons Regular of the Lateran (CRL, Canonici Regulares Lateranenses), formally titled the Canons Regular of St. Augustine of the Congregation of the Most Holy Savior at the Lateran, is an international congregation of canons regular, comprising priests and lay brothers, in the Catholic Church. They received their present name from Pope Eugene IV in 1446.

== History ==
The canons regular trace their origins to the 4th century reforms of the clergy by Martin of Tours in France and Eusebius of Vercelli in Italy. They and other bishops sought to shape the accepted lifestyles of their clergy on a domestic model, based on the communal pattern followed by the first Christians as depicted in the Acts of the Apostles. The premier example of this effort was the life and work of Augustine of Hippo, who himself lived as a monk before being called to take up the office of bishop for his North African city. He later wrote a short monastic rule to guide a community of women who wanted to live the monastic ideal. This document became the official guide for the earliest of the religious communities to emerge in the church in later centuries, in parallel to that of the Rule of St. Benedict. From this comes the title "regular", meaning one following a "rule" (Latin: regula).

Under the guidance of Cardinal Hildebrand of Sovana (later to become Pope Gregory VII), the Lateran Synod of 1059 organized and recognized these developing communities and recommended them as the preferred pattern of clerical life, at a time when mandatory celibacy was being made a universal requirement for the clergy of the Roman Church.

Among notable canons was Abbot Giuseppe Ricciotti (1890–1964), who wrote on Scripture and ancient history.

The canons' distinctive habit comprises a totally white cassock, sash, shoulder cape (mozzetta) and skull cap (zucchetto), identical to what the Pope wears as his daily attire.

The congregation is based near the ancient Basilica of San Pietro in Vincoli (St. Peter in Chains), where the current Abbot General lives with the General Curia of the Congregation, the current Abbot General Rt Rev. Edoardo Parisotto CRL was elected on 26th June 2024. Provinces exist in Argentina, Belgium, Italy, Poland, the Netherlands, France, Spain, and the United States. It is a member of the Confederation of Canons regular.

== Relationship with France ==
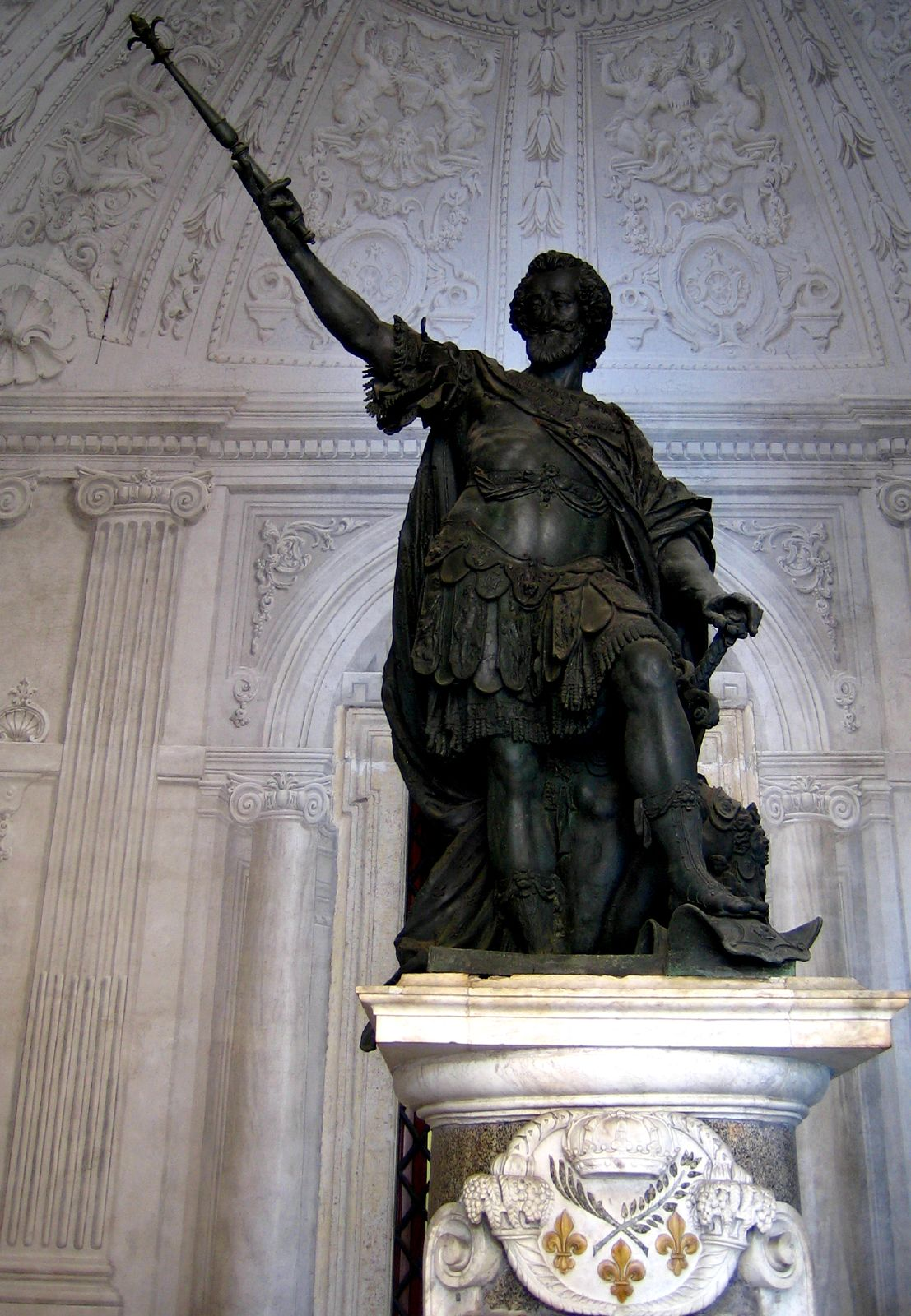
Statue of Henry IV by Nicolas Cordier (1608), Lateran Basilica

In 1482 and 1483, King Louis XI of France donated the revenue from several southern French domains to the Canons Regular of the Lateran, including properties of the Clairac Abbey in Clairac, Guyenne, to help finance reconstruction works of St. John's Basilica which had suffered fires in the 14th century and had been left in disrepair during the Avignon Papacy. The corresponding payments lapsed after 1507.

In 1604, the Canons claimed that revenue was due to them from the abbey under Louis XI's donation. Instead of accepting this claim, King Henry IV of France, following a suggestion from Cardinal Arnaud d'Ossat, gave the abbey itself to the Roman Canons, as a token of his and France's Catholic goodwill following the turmoil of the French Wars of Religion. Pope Paul V confirmed the abbey's union with the Canons Regular in a bull of October 1605, in turn ratified by Henry on 4 February 1606. As a consequence, half of the Clairac Abbey's income was reserved for St. John Lateran, while the other half went to the Bishopric of Agen. The bull stipulated that the Cardinal Vicar would give an annual mass in St John's Basilica for France's happiness and prosperity (pro felici ac prospero statu Galliae), every year on Henry's birthdate on December 13, known in French as the messe pour la prospérité de la France - a distinction that has not been granted to any other nation. Moreover, Henry and his successors would become "First and Only Honorary Canon" of the Canons Regular's congregation.

In 1606, the Canons also heeded a suggestion by French ambassador Charles de Neufville, overcoming objections from pro-Spanish ultra-catholics who resented Henry's earlier Protestant allegiances, and commissioned a heroic statue of Henry IV from sculptor Nicolas Cordier, which was erected in August 1609 under the Basilica's side portico. Clairac Abbey, however, was nationalized in 1792 and sold in 1799. The resulting financial dispute between the Vatican and the French state went through various arrangements and was finally settled in 1927.

With some ups and downs since Henry IV, the Vatican has maintained the tradition of making French heads of state honorary canons of St. John Lateran, upon their visit to Rome. After many decades of neglect, the tradition was revived by President René Coty in 1957 and upheld by his successors Charles de Gaulle, Valéry Giscard d'Estaing, Jacques Chirac and Nicolas Sarkozy. Even presidents who did not formally receive the title in Rome, namely Georges Pompidou, François Mitterrand and François Hollande, accepted it - "by tradition", as Hollande put it despite being himself an atheist. Emmanuel Macron was the latest French President to receive the title of honorary canon on a visit to Rome and Pope Francis, on 26 June 2018.
