= Claudius Mamertinus =

4th century official in the Roman Empire

Claudius Mamertinus (fl. mid-late 4th century AD) was an official in the Roman Empire. In late 361 he took part in the Chalcedon tribunal to condemn the ministers of Constantius II, and in 362, he was made consul as a reward by the new Emperor Julian; on January 1 of that year he delivered a panegyric in Constantinople by way of thanks to the Emperor. The text of this is extant, preserved in the Panegyrici Latini. Claudius Mamertinus later went on to become praetorian prefect of Italy, Africa, and Illyria before being removed from public office in 368 for embezzlement.

The panegyric text is followed by two panegyrics from three quarters of a century earlier, addressed to the Emperor Maximian (the first delivered in 289 and the second in 290 or 291). The text of the Panegyrici that has survived also attributes these to Claudius Mamertinus; it is unclear whether there was an older orator of the same name or the text is corrupt. They have also been attributed to Eumenius but later scholarship disputes that attribution.

Political offices
Preceded by Taurus, and Florentius	Consul of the Roman Empire; 362 with Nevitta	Succeeded by Flavius Claudius Julianus Augustus IV, and Flavius Sallustius
