= Florentius (consul 361) =

Florentius was a Roman praetorian prefect under the Caesar Julian and later a consul, before falling from grace when Julian became emperor.

== Life ==
Florentius is first heard of when he arrives in Gaul as a praetorian prefect of Constantius II in 357. He spoke in support of engaging the enemy as the Battle of Strasbourg loomed. Later that year when revenue from Gaul did not reach desired levels from the poll-tax and the land-tax, he took measures to raise special levies to make up for the shortfall. However, Julian opposed the imposition of the extra burden on the people of Gaul and Constantius decided against the policy of his own prefect.

Florentius nevertheless continued as prefect in Gaul until early in 360, when an order came from Constantius for Gallic troops to be sent to the eastern front. The order, Ammianus Marcellinus believed, was at the instigation of Florentius, who unaccountably withdrew to Vienne and busied himself there, Ammianus believing that this was anticipating the disturbances following the arrival of the order. And when Florentius heard that Julian had been raised to Augustus, he abandoned Gaul and sought out Constantius.

Constantius must have held him in high regard for first he appointed him praetorian prefect of Illyricum when Anatolius died, then made him a consul in 361. When Julian's rebellion broke out, Florentius fled Italy. Not long after Julian became emperor a tribunal was set up at Chalcedon early in 362, which condemned Florentius to death in absentia. When two former members of the secret service offered to point out to Julian where Florentius was hiding, Julian rebuked them as informers and refused to hear more, preferring to leave him hiding in fear.

Florentius is probably mentioned again by Ammianus Marcellinus as the supporter of the usurper Procopius who, in 366, was one of the men who handed the usurper over to Valens. He is described by Ammianus as having gained fame in the fiercest wars and as having become Procopius' supporter through necessity, not inclination. Nonetheless, as soon as they had handed Procopius over to Valens (who immediately beheaded him), Florentius and his colleague the tribune Barchalba, were also put to death. Ammianus laments that they should have been rewarded for handing over a traitor. Philostorgius, however, claims that Florentius was burned alive by the troops out to avenge an earlier slight.

== Footnotes ==
Political offices
Preceded by Flavius Julius Constantius Augustus X, Flavius Claudius Julianus Caesar III	Consul of the Roman Empire; 361 with Taurus	Succeeded by Claudius Mamertinus, Nevitta
