= Giuseppe Ricciotti =

Italian Biblical scholar and archeologist

- Born: 27 February 1890; Rome, Italy
- Died: 22 January 1964 (aged 73); Rome, Italy
- Occupations: scholar and priest
- Awards: Silver Medal of Military Valor

Academic background
- Education: Pontifical Biblical Institute; Pontifical Gregorian University; Sapienza University of Rome

Academic work
- Discipline: archaeology Biblical studies
- Institutions: University of Rome; University of Bari
- Notable works: The Life of Christ

Giuseppe Ricciotti CRL (1890 in Rome – 1964) was an Italian canon regular, Biblical scholar and archeologist. He is famous mainly for his book The Life of Christ edited in 1941 and reedited and reprinted several times.

== Life ==
Ricciotti was born in Rome on 27 February 1890. In 1905 he entered the novitiate of the Roman Catholic religious order of the Canons Regular of the Lateran, taking religious vows the following year. After his seminary studies and completing mandatory military service, he was ordained as a priest in 1913. After ordination, Ricciotti continued his studies at the University of Rome, where he took courses in both philosophy and theology. At the same time he did coursework at the Pontifical Biblical Institute.

During World War I he was required to interrupt his studies and to perform military service, during which time he served as a military chaplain, volunteering for service at the front lines, and was afterwards awarded a Silver Medal of Military Valor for his service in the trenches, where he was seriously wounded. Because of this experience, he came to oppose any kind of war.

After the war, Ricciotti resumed his studies and graduated in 1919 with a degree in Biblical Studies. From 1924 onwards, he taught Hebrew literature at the University of Rome. He also taught similar courses briefly at the University of Genoa and at the University of Bari, where he taught from 1935 to 1960. In addition to this, Ricciotti set up and directed a small seminary in Liguria.

In 1935 he was appointed Procurator General of his religious congregation. During World War II, due to his office he was able to give refuge to many refugees at the congregation's motherhouse at the Basilica of St. Peter in Chains. During this period, he also served as a consultant to the Vatican Congregation for the Clergy. He held this position for his congregation until 1946, when he was named as the Abbot of Gubbio.

Giuseppe Ricciotti died in Rome on 22 January 1964.

== Works ==
Ricciotti's first important work is Storia d'Israele (English: History of Israel), published in 1932. In 1932 he also published Bibbia e non Bibbia (English: Bible and not Bible) where he supported the need to apply the Higher criticism to the study of the Bible, to be based on the original texts and not on the Latin Vulgate. In 1934 Ricciotti took a stand against the increasing antisemitism publishing the translations in Italian of sermons of Cardinal Michael von Faulhaber in favour of the Hebrews.

The period in which he worked was one of deep suspicion of Biblical Studies in Italy. As a result, Ricciotti was partially involved in the late stages of the Modernist crisis. He was attacked, along with his friend Ernesto Buonaiuti, by the most conservative Catholic wing. Differently from Buonaiuti, his positions were finally judged not to be modernist, and he accepted criticism by the Pontifical Biblical Commission to some of his works.

His masterpiece is Vita di Gesù Cristo (English: Life of Jesus Christ), edited in 1941 and published many times. The scholar Nicolotti writes: "His works on biblical texts, of a rather conservative character, show a solid historical and philological training, not at all alien to the contemporary acquisitions of the critic." Ricciotti's Life of Christ was translated from the Italian by Alba I. Zizzamia in 1947. This work received favorable critical reviews in the Catholic Biblical Quarterly and other scholarly publications. Ricciotti's Life of St. Paul (Rome, 1946, trans. as Paul the Apostle, Milwaukee, Wisc., 1953) was meant to complement his Life of Christ. Giuseppe Ricciotti also wrote: La «Era dei martiri» (English: The Age of Martyrs), Rome, 1953, trans. Rev. Anthony Bull. New York: Barnes & Noble Books, 1992, La Bibbia e le scoperte moderne (English: The Bible and Modern Discoveries), 1957, and L'imperatore Giuliano l'Apostata secondo i documenti (English: Julian the Apostate), 1958, trans. M. Joseph Costelloe, S.J. (1960; reprint, Rockford, Ill.: TAN Books, 1999). Additionally, he edited a new translation into Italian of the Bible from the original texts.

== Legacy ==
Ricciotti's book Vita di Gesù Cristo ("Life of Jesus Christ") was extremely popular and influential in Italy, selling 40.000 copies in its first edition and being praised by the Royal Academy of Italy; even Italian fascist dictator Benito Mussolini read a copy of the book. It has been re-printed several times and can still be easily found in Italian libraries and bookstores even today. It was also greatly praised by Catholic peer journals of that time, but received strong criticism from excommunicated modernist Catholic Ernesto Buonaiuti.

More recently, some Catholic scholars have been critical of Ricciotti's work: Italian Catholic cardinal and biblical scholar Gianfranco Ravasi has stated that the text is "not immune to many apologetic simplifications". Fr. Giulio Michelini OFM believes that Ricciotti's book shows many of the flaws of Catholic scholars of the time: a tendency towards gospel harmony, vehement and excessive attacks toward Protestant scholarship (especially Rudolf Bultmann), insufficient knowledge of Second Temple Judaism and even some anti-Jewish interpretation of the Gospels (see blood curse). Fr. Giuseppe Segalla, while praising the book for its style of writing, categorized it as an apologetic work.

Despite this, Ricciotti's work is still widely appreciated by Italian conservative Catholics like Vittorio Messori and Luca Doninelli.
