= Misopogon =

Satirical essay by the Roman Emperor Julian

The Misopogon ('Beard-Hater') is a satirical essay on philosophers by the Roman Emperor Julian. It was written in Classical Greek. The satire was written in Antioch in February or March 363, not long before Julian departed for his fateful Persian campaign.

Glanville Downey says of the text:

Julian vented his spleen in the famous satire, the Misopogon or Beard-Hater, in which, by pretending to satirize himself and the philosopher's beard which he wore in a clean-shaven age, he was able to pour forth his bitter anger against, and disappointment with, the people of Antioch.
