= Taurus (consul 361) =

Flavius Taurus (fl. 355–361) was a politician and a military officer of the Roman Empire. He was Praetorian Prefect of Italy and Africa, and consul in 361 AD.

== Biography ==
His father was of humble origins. Taurus had three children, Armonius, died about 391, Eutychianus, praetorian prefect of the East and consul in 398, and Aurelianus, praetorian prefect of the East and consul in 400.

Taurus was praetorian prefect of Italy and Africa, as well as Patricius, from 355 to 361, and consul in 361. In the year of his consulate, the Caesar Julian, stationed in Gaul, was proclaimed Augustus by the troops and moved with the army against the Augustus Constantius II, who was in the East. When the news that Julian had crossed the Alps arrived in Rome, the consuls Taurus and Florentius, who supported Constantius, left the city; then Julian had them indicated in documents as fugitive consuls. Taurus was later convicted for this flight in the trial that was held at Chalcedon in 361 and sent into exile in Vercelli.

== Bibliography ==
- Martindale, John R.; Jones, A. H. M.; Morris, John, eds. (1971). The Prosopography of the Later Roman Empire: Volume I, AD 260–395. Cambridge: Cambridge University Press. p. 1146. ISBN 0-521-07233-6.

Political offices
Preceded by Imp. Caesar Flavius Julius Constantius Augustus X, Flavius Claudius Iulianus Caesar III	Consul of the Roman Empire; 361 with Flavius Florentius	Succeeded by Claudius Mamertinus, Flavius Nevitta
