= Salutius =

Roman official and Neoplatonist author

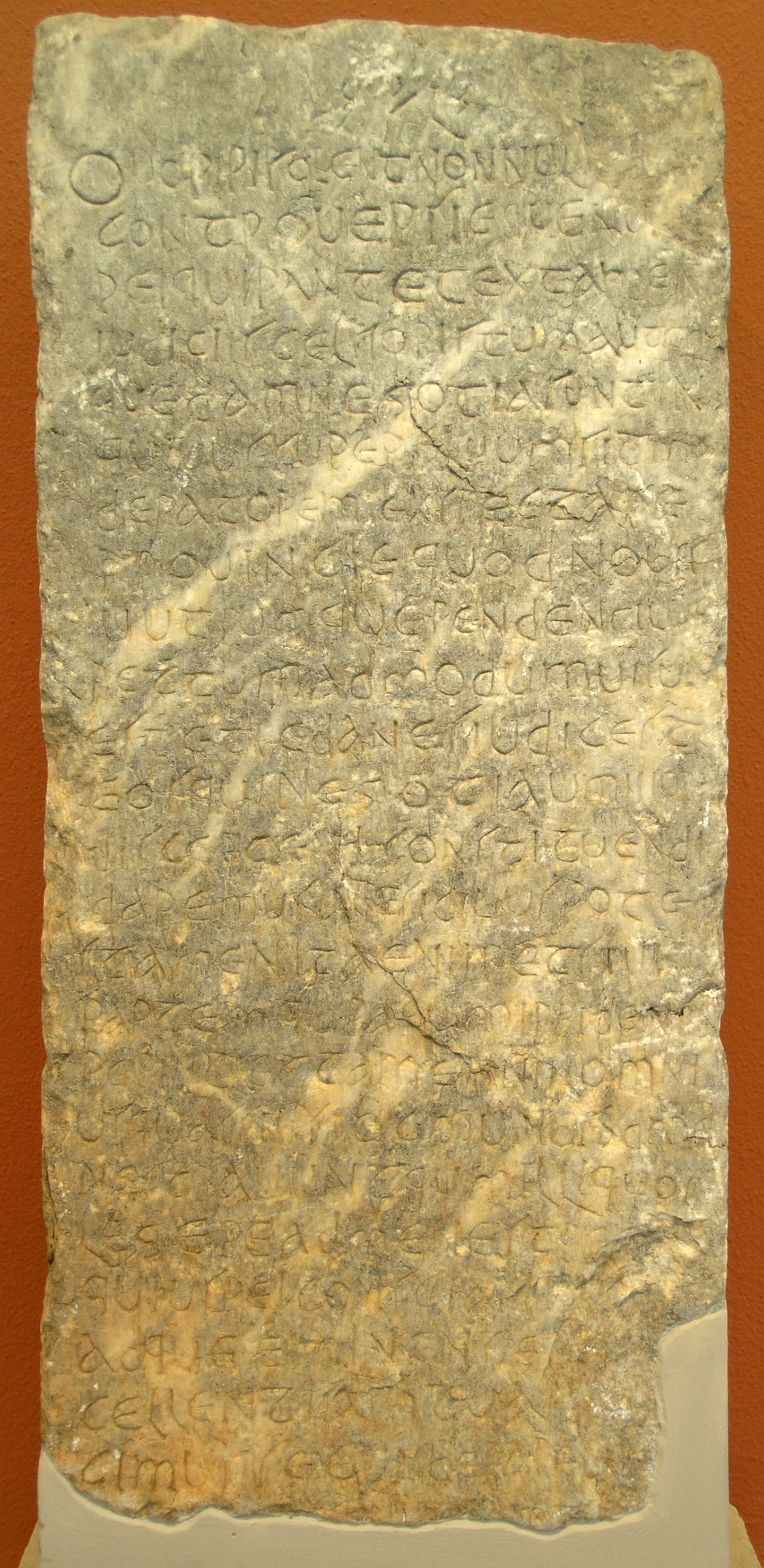
- Edict from Emperor Julian to Secundus, prefect of the Eastern Praetorium concerning the judgment of minor cases. Latin copy found at Amorgos. around 362 AD
- Born: Saturninius Secundus; 4th century
- Died: 4th century
- Occupations: Bureaucrat and author
- Years active: fl. 355–367
- Notable work: On the Gods and the Cosmos
- Office: Governor of Aquitania; Governor of Africa; Magister memoriae Praetorian prefect
- Children: 1 son

Saturninius Secundus Salutius (fl. 355–367) was a Roman official and Neoplatonist author. A native of Gaul, he had a successful career as a provincial governor and officer at the imperial court, becoming a close friend and adviser of the Emperor Julian. Salutius was well versed in Greek philosophy and rhetoric, and had a reputation for competence and incorruptibility in office. He authored a Neoplatonic religious treatise titled On the Gods and the Cosmos, in support of Julian's pagan reaction against Christianity.

== Life ==
Salutius's official name was Saturninius Secundus, as he is called in inscriptions and official documents. The signum, or informal name, 'Salutius', sometimes 'Salustius', was otherwise the main way to refer to him. He was born to a non-senatorial family in Roman Gaul, and was a pagan. His career included governorships of Gallia Aquitania and Africa, as well as the position of magister memoriae at the imperial court. He probably held these offices under the emperor Constans, as he was already an old man by the time he was assigned to the staff of Julian Caesar in Gaul. It was probably through his counsel that Julian developed the skills of administration he displayed in Gaul. In 359 AD, Constantius II removed him from Gaul.

When Julian became sole emperor, he raised Salutius to praetorian prefect of the Orient late in 361. One of Salutius' early tasks was to oversee the Chalcedon tribunal. Salutius accompanied his emperor on the Persian campaign, during which Julian was killed. As a sign of their great respect for him, the military command first nominated him to become their emperor, but Salutius refused the honor, pleading illness and old age, and the purple then fell to Jovian. After the return from Persia, Salutius continued in the office of praetorian prefect during the reign of Valentinian until he was replaced by Nebridius.

== On the Gods and the Cosmos ==
Salutius, and not his contemporary Flavius Sallustius, is almost certainly to be identified as the Salustios (Ancient Greek: Σαλούστιος) who, according to Photios, wrote the theological pamphlet On the Gods and the Cosmos (Περὶ θεῶν καὶ κόσμου Peri theōn kai kosmou).

The work, a kind of catechism of 4th-century Hellenic paganism, owes much to that of Iamblichus of Chalcis, who synthesized Platonism with Pythagoreanism and theurgy, and also to Julian's own philosophical writings. The treatise is quite concise, and generally free of the lengthy metaphysical theorizing of the more detailed Neoplatonic texts. Its aim is in part "to parry the usual onslaughts of Christian polemic" in the face of Christianity's growing preeminence, and "me[e]t theology with theology".

=== Editions ===
- Gilbert Murray. 1925 "On the Gods and the World," appended to Murray's Five Stages of Greek Religion, first published in 1912 as Four Stages of Greek Religion.
- Arthur Darby Nock (ed/trans.). 1926. Sallustius concerning the gods and the universe. Edited with prolegomena and translation. Available in various reprints, for example ISBN 0-89005-550-5 and ISBN 3-487-01413-0.
- Gabriel Rochefort. 1960. Des dieux et du monde. Edition of the Greek text, with French translation and notes, in the Collection Budé.
- Thomas Taylor (ed/trans.). 1793. Sallust, On the gods and the world; and the Pythagoric sentences of Demophilus, translated from the Greek; and five hymns by Proclus, in the original Greek, with a poetical version. To which are added five hymns by the translator. Reprinted many times, for example ISBN 0-7661-6735-6.
