= Flavius Sallustius =

Roman politician

Flavius Sallustius was a career Roman official whom the emperor Julian appointed praetorian prefect of Gaul shortly after he proclaimed himself emperor. Some experts identify him with the Neoplatonist Sallustius.

Julian rewarded his loyalty by making Sallustius his colleague as consul for the year 363 AD. G. W. Bowersock explains that Julian left Sallustius in Gaul when he marched out of Gaul to contest the empire with his cousin Constantius II "to ensure the loyalty of the West to the new Augustus."

Sallustius played one more part in the life of the emperor Julian. When the emperor was engaged in his final campaign against the Persians, and was supervising his troops preparing to cross the Khabur river, he received a letter from Sallustius begging him to leave off his campaign, "for having not prayed to the gods for protection he was exposing himself to inevitable destruction." This was but one of many inauspicious omens later remembered after Julian's death in combat.

It is unclear how long Sallustius held the post of pretorian prefect after Julian's death on 26 June. He is attested in office in September; his successor Decimius Germanianus is not attested as praetorian prefect of Gaul before 18 December of that year. He probably retired to a villa in central Spain.

Political offices
Preceded by Claudius Mamertinus; Nevitta	Roman consul 363 with Julian	Succeeded by Jovian; Varronianus
