= Julian (novel) =

1964 novel by Gore Vidal

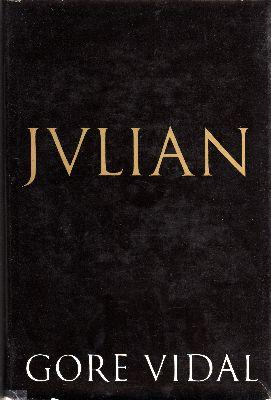
- Cover of the first edition
- Author: Gore Vidal
- Language: English
- Genre: Historical novel
- Publisher: Little, Brown & Company
- Publication date: June 8, 1964
- Publication place: United States
- Media type: Print (Hardback & Paperback)
- OCLC: 53289864
- Dewey Decimal: 813/.54 22
- LC Class: PS3543.I26 J8 2003

Julian is a 1964 novel by Gore Vidal, a work of historical fiction dealing with the life of the Roman emperor Flavius Claudius Julianus (known to Christians as Julian the Apostate), who reigned briefly from 361 to 363 A.D.

== Synopsis ==
The book takes the form of the correspondence between two Hellenistic pagans: Libanius, who is considering writing a biography of Julian; and Priscus, who possesses Julian's personal memoir. The novel—told mostly in the first person—begins on March of AD 380, nearly 20 years after the death of Julian. Libanius and Priscus of Epirus exchange a series of letters, in which the two former confidantes of Julian discuss their respective lives, and in particular the recent events involving an imperial edict of Theodosius involving the Nicene Creed of Christianity. In his first letter to Priscus, Libanius proposes to write a biography of Julian; eventually, Priscus agrees to send a manuscript written by Julian himself to Libanius, along with his own comments (written in the margins thereof).

The memoir relates Julian's life from the time so many members of his family were purged by his cousin, the emperor Constantius II (whom he succeeded on the throne); his "exile", during childhood, to spend in libraries that time in which other boys might instead have been playing together outside; and his subsequent negative childhood experiences with Christian hypocrisy and conflict over dogma (see Arianism). As he matures, a rift forms between Julian and his disturbed half-brother Constantius Gallus, who is made Caesar (heir to the purple) by Constantius II; Julian claims, for his safety, to have no interest but philosophy, and so undertakes a journey to Athens to study under the city's greatest teachers. Here, he first sees Libanius, the book's narrator, and has an affair with a female philosopher (Macrina). He also comes to know some of the early Church Fathers in their formative years, including the agreeable Basil of Caesarea and the abrasive and dishonest Gregory of Nazianzus. Julian becomes a lector—a minor office in the Christian church—but continues to learn about the traditional religions: he studies Neoplatonism under Aedesius in Asia Minor, and is initiated into the Eleusinian Mysteries (which he would later try to restore) in Athens.

Julian is eventually made Caesar in place of Gallus, who was executed by Constantius II for cruelty and debauchery, as well as to satisfy Constantius' legendary insecurity and paranoia. This leaves Julian the successor to Constantius II, and he is given (at first nominal) command of Gaul as it is under attack by the Alamanni. Subsequently, Julian seizes hands-on military and administrative control from his 'advisors,' and, against expectations, experiences overwhelming military success over the Germans at Strasbourg. Upon the death of Helena (Julian's wife, and Constantius' sister), and in the face of Constantius' ever-increasing manic paranoia, Julian undertakes a short rebellion against Constantius, which ends—bloodlessly and in victory—with Constantius' natural death during the journey to confront Julian, and Julian's accession to the title of Augustus.

Julian's early reign is successful, with the removal from office of court eunuchs, whose true role Julian sees as being to drag on the state coffers and to isolate the emperors from real-world concerns. He also undertakes attempts to prevent the spread of Christianity; referring to the religion throughout the novel as 'back-country' and a 'death-cult' (and churches as 'charnel-houses', for their reverence of relics), Julian sees the best means to do this as to block Christians from teaching classical literature, thus relegating their religion to non-intellectual audiences and thwarting attempts by Christians to develop the sophisticated rhetoric and intellectualism of traditional Roman and Hellenistic religions. Here, Julian's headstrong nature begins to affect his ability to know his own capabilities, evident in several clashes with the Trinitarian clergy and with advisors. Nonetheless, Julian takes the opportunity to outline his arguments against Christianity, and to lay out his vision for reforming and restoring Roman civic life. His reforms are under way when, in spite of his own faith in prophecy, Julian undertakes an ill-omened campaign to reclaim Roman Mesopotamia from the Sassanid Empire.

This marks a turning point in the novel, as it ends Julian's memoir. The remainder consists of field dispatches and diary entries detailing Julian's campaign, with commentary by Priscus and Libanius' reflections. Initially, Julian is successful (in spite of his relying on Xenophon's dated Anabasis for geographic details of the region), reaching Ctesiphon and defeating the Persian emperor in several decisive battles. However, after Persian scorched-earth tactics leave Julian's army with no food or water, it becomes apparent that the Christian officers' loyalty is in question, and that a plot may be afoot to kill Julian. Priscus recounts a short conversation with another non-Christian advisor during the campaign, in which he is told simply, 'we're not safe'. Indeed, Julian's dispatches begin to show delusion on the part of the emperor, and in spite of his steadily eroding grasp of reality and his own limitations, he presses on until a near mutiny of his soldiers. Not long after, during the return to Roman territory, Julian rushes to fight off a Persian attack on the line, eschewing his armor, since his aide Callistus has not repaired its broken straps. Julian returns to camp mortally wounded, and in spite of the efforts of his physician and friend Oribasius, he dies without picking a successor. Here, Vidal's narrative departs slightly from the known story of Julian, as it becomes apparent in the novel that Julian was wounded by a Roman spear. Upon the removal of Julian's body, Priscus secretly rifles through Julian's belongings, taking Julian's memoir and diary for himself and saving them from censorship. The Christian officers win the debate over whom to elevate to the title of Augustus, settling on the simple-minded and drunken Jovian. The campaign ends in disaster, and Jovian cedes significant portions of Rome's eastern territory to the Sassanid Empire.

The rest of the novel consists of the continuing correspondence of Libanius and Priscus; Libanius asks Priscus what he knows about Julian's death, himself suspecting that there was always a plot among the Christian officers to kill Julian. Priscus responds (with the assurance that his role as the source of such information would be kept anonymous) that, upon visiting Callistus years later, Priscus asked whether Callistus, who rode into battle with Julian on the day of his death, saw who killed the emperor. Callistus' originally one-dimensional and vague tale began to take on more detail, and when Priscus again asked whether Callistus knows the killer's identity, Callistus responded that he did, of course: 'it was I who killed the Emperor Julian'. Callistus recounted breaking the straps on Julian's armor before the fatal engagement, and personally stabbing Julian with his spear. Priscus asked how Callistus could have hated Julian, his benefactor. The Christian Callistus responded, chillingly, that he did not hate Julian, but admired him, and that 'every day [Callistus] pray[s]' for Julian's soul. Priscus closes the anecdote by begging Libanius to keep his name out of any published account of Julian's death, citing Callistus' powerful co-conspirators from the army and Theodosius' well-documented brutality, and Libanius' worst fears about Julian's death are confirmed.

The novel ends with Libanius' sending a letter to the emperor Theodosius seeking permission to publish Julian's memoir; it is denied. Lamenting his ill health, Theodosius' politically motivated proscription of traditional religion, and the end of intellectual culture and its replacement by widespread religious violence and intolerance, Libanius meets John Chrysostom, his former best student, giving a sermon at a Christian church. Libanius finally realizes that traditional religion is defeated, seeing as even the best and brightest of his students have enthusiastically adopted Christianity. Irritated by John's solemn triumph, Libanius calls Christianity a death-cult, and in response, John Chrysostom morbidly implies that Christianity embraces the coming death of the classical world. By extension, though somewhat more vaguely, John claims that he awaits the coming apocalypse. In closing, Libanius writes, prophetically, that he hopes the coming collapse of reason and the Roman world will be only temporary, likening the dying of the Empire to that of his oil lamp, and expresses the hope that reason and 'man's love of light' would one day bring back the prosperity, stability, and intellectualism of the pre-Christian empire.

== Major themes ==
Vidal's own introduction notes that it deals with the changes to Christianity wrought by Constantine and his successors. Vidal's view is that the promotion of Christianity by Constantine, and the creation of an orthodoxy, conflicting schools of thought (many later denounced as heresy), was driven by Constantine's political needs, rather than a deeply held belief, and that this policy was continued by his dynastic successors.

Like other historical novels by Vidal, the novel is based on extensive use of contemporary sources, including Julian's own works, and much of the latter part of the book obviously uses Ammianus Marcellinus (who witnessed Julian's death) and Libanius, both of whom were friends of Julian and appear as characters in the novel. It also reflects the opinion of Julian held by Edward Gibbon in his History of the Decline and Fall of the Roman Empire.

The death of Julian, and the reasons for it, are based on the opinion of Libanius and Vidal's interpretation of a very short but vital lacuna in Ammianus' history as due to active censorship rather than the ravages of time.

== Critical reception ==
Julian has been criticized by historian Robert Browning for crediting its subject with sexual exploits for which there is no evidence. Browning notes in addition that in the book, "Julian is less surely and clearly delineated in his relation to political power or to God than he is in relation to his fellow men or to his own inner life."

== See also ==
- Julian (emperor)
- Mithraism
- Neoplatonism
- Creation
- Misopogon (Beard Hater)
