= Maximus of Ephesus =

4th-century Neoplatonist philosopher

Maximus of Ephesus (Ancient Greek: Μάξιμος ὁ Ἐφέσιος; c. 310 – 372 AD) was a Neoplatonic philosopher. He is said to have come from a rich family, and exercised great influence over the emperor Julian, who was commended to him by Aedesius. Maximus pandered to the emperor's love of magic and theurgy and won a high position at court, where his overbearing manner made him numerous enemies. He spent an interval in prison after the death of Julian, and eventually was executed by Valens.

== Life ==
The most detailed source for the life of Maximus is Eunapius in his Lives of the Sophists, but he is also referred to by Ammianus Marcellinus, the emperor Julian, and Libanius. Christian writers also discuss him, albeit in very negative terms.

Maximus was born around the beginning of the 4th century. Ammianus Marcellinus calls Ephesus the hometown of Maximus. This is doubted by some scholars, but it is certain that he originated from the west of Asia Minor. His parents were wealthy. Maximus had a brother named Claudianus, who also became a philosopher. Another brother, Nymphidianus, served emperor Julian as Magister epistolarum graecarum (secretary for Greek correspondence). Ammonius Hermiae reported that Maximus was a pupil of the Neoplatonist "Hierius".

From around 335–350 Maximus was in Pergamon as a pupil of Aedesius. While he was there, Maximus studied alongside Chrysanthius, Eusebius of Myndus, and Priscus. Many Neoplatonists practiced theurgy (attempting to commune with God by special ritual actions), and there is a testimony according to which Maximus successfully broke a love-spell which had been cast on the philosopher Sosipatra by one of her relatives.

Around 350, Maximus left Pergamon in order to work in Ephesus as a philosophy teacher. Apparently Christians also participated in his instruction: a Christian named Sisinnius, who later became a Novatianist bishop in Constantinople, is said to have studied with Maximus. In 351, the later emperor Julian went to Pergamon, where Eusebius warned him against getting involved with the magic arts practised by Maximus. The warning only enticed Julian, who trained with Maximus in Ephesus between May 351 and April 352.

Julian was appointed caesar in 355, remaining in contact with Maximus. In 361, as augustus, Julian brought Priscus and Maximus to Constantinople. Maximus accepted the emperor's invitation despite receiving unfavourable omens, and is said to have explained that it was possible to force the favour of the gods. Both Neoplatonists were close companions of the emperor, who used them as religious-philosophical advisors and discussion partners. Eunapius states that Maximus and Priscus had no political authority, but also writes that Maximus became arrogantly inaccessible and used his influential position to personally enrich himself. Maximus accompanied Julian to Antioch in the summer of 362, and was among the emperor's entourage in the following year's Persian campaign. Before Julian died on 26 June 363 from a combat injury, he held a last philosophical conversation with Maximus and Priscus.

Maximus continued to receive imperial favour under the emperor Jovian, but after Jovian's death his enemies came after him. In spring 364 he was accused of causing a lengthy illness in the new emperors Valentinian I and Valens. This accusation could not be confirmed, and was dropped. But his numerous opponents did not relent; in 365/366 he was again arrested and accused of having illegitimately enriched himself. A high fine was imposed, and he was sent "to Asia" - probably into his homeland – to find the means to pay. Unable to raise enough money, he was tortured. Eunapius reported that Maximus wanted to kill himself, as he could no longer bear the pain, and his wife procured some poison. His wife drank the poison first, but Maximus then did not drink.

Later Maximus was released by order of the proconsul of Asia, Clearchus, who was a supporter of the old religion. The philosopher was restored to a large part of his confiscated property and resumed teaching, even daring to return to Constantinople.

Around 370, Emperor Valens was informed that a group of individuals had consulted an oracle to find out who the next emperor would be, and were told that Valens would "die a strange death" and be succeeded by a man whose name began with the letters Theod. Valens responded with a massacre of individuals with those letters at the beginning of their names, and a general persecution of polytheistic philosophers. Eunapius indicates that Maximus, falsely implicated in the oracle plot, was executed by Festus, the new proconsul of Asia, in 372.

== Works ==
The Suda says that Maximus is the author of a book Perì katarchôn (On initiatives), an astrological text that has been preserved. He also wrote a number of works including On Insoluble Contradictions, On Forecasts, On Numbers, and a commentary on Aristotle. Two lost commentaries are testified from other sources: one on the Categories, from which a fragment survives, and one on the Prior Analytics, to which Themistius responded. Maximus is reported to have agreed with Eusebius, Iamblichus and Porphyry in asserting the perfection of the second and third figures of the syllogism.
