= Eusebius of Myndus =

Ancient Neoplatonist philosopher

- Εὐσέβιος
- Born: c. 4th century Myndus

Philosophical work
- Era: Late antiquity
- Region: Ancient Roman philosophy
- School: Neoplatonism

Eusebius of Myndus (Ancient Greek: Εὐσέβιος) was a 4th-century philosopher, a distinguished Neoplatonist. He is described by Eunapius as one of the links in the "Golden Chain" of Neoplatonism.

He was a pupil of Aedesius of Pergamum. He devoted himself principally to logic and ventured to criticize the magical and theurgic side of the doctrine. By this he exasperated the later Emperor Julian, who preferred the mysticism of Maximus and Chrysanthius.

== Life ==
Eusebius is known only from the biographies of the philosophers and sophists written by Eunapius of Sardis. Eunapius was a student of Chrysanthius of Sardis, a fellow student of Eusebius.

Eusebius was from the city of Myndus in Caria on the southwest coast of Asia Minor; today there is the village of Gümüşlük. Nothing is known about his family and childhood. He studied at Pergamon under the distinguished Neoplatonic philosopher Aedesius. Aedesius, a student of the famous Neoplatonist Iamblichus, had opened his own school after his death. Besides Chrysanthios, Eusebius' fellow students at Pergamum included the philosophers Maximus of Ephesus and Priscus.

In 351, the future emperor Julian came to Pergamon to take lessons from Aedesius. After a time, because of his advanced age, Aedesius, who was already very old, entrusted the task of teaching Julian to his disciples. Since Maximus was then in Ephesus and Priscus in Greece, Eusebius and Chrysanthius became the teachers of the prominent student of philosophy. Eusebius impressed Julian with his extraordinary didactic skills.

Unlike most Neoplatonists of the time, Eusebius rejected the religious practices of theurgy, which sought to magically and ritually obtain divine assistance, purify the soul, and establish a connection with the world of the gods. He held that the effects of magic and theurgy were not of divine origin, but illusions produced by material forces; it is a question of a wrong path, which contributes nothing to the purification of the soul, but leads to madness. Just like Plotinus, the founder of the Neoplatonic trend, and in contrast to Iamblichus, Eusebius was convinced that the ascent of the soul and its return to the spiritual world could not be accomplished through external actions within the framework of cult practice, but only through a purely spiritual purification, which can be achieved by means of reason. He therefore did not think he was dependent on divine intervention, but trusted in the soul's ability to redeem itself through philosophical knowledge. Eusebius therefore warned Julian of his former fellow student Maximus of Ephesus, who placed theurgy at the center of his efforts. In doing so, however, Eusebius achieved the opposite of what he was aiming for; Julian broke off his education in Pergamum and went to Ephesus to Maximus, whose direction he joined.

Nothing is known about the later fate of Eusebius. It is also unknown whether he wrote anything. Several moral sayings in the Ionian dialect have survived under the name of Eusebius in Stobaeus, which Daniel Wyttenbach and Friedrich Wilhelm August Mullach attributed to Eusebius of Myndus without any compelling reason. However, Eduard Zeller pointed out that there is no trace of Neoplatonic ideas in these moral sayings, which is why the identification of these two sayings is generally rejected.
