= Theodotus of Laodicea =

Bishop in Laodicea, Syria, during the early 4th century CE

Theodotus (Greek: Θεόδοτος; c. 260 – c. 335) was the bishop of Laodicea in Syria from the early 300s. He replaced Stephen, (Note: Stephen became bishop in 282 or 283. He had a secular education and was well-studied in philosophy. He is one of the few apostates named by Eusebius, who heaps scorn on him.) who apostasized during the Great Persecution (303–313). The exact year of his consecration cannot be fixed more precisely. He attended at least four church councils.

According to Eusebius of Caesarea's Historia ecclesiastica, Theodotus "proved his personal name ... true" and was a gift from God to the diocese of Laodicea. (Note: "Theodotus" means God-given in Greek.) Eusebius also praises him for his knowledge of "the science of bodily healing" and for being a "dedicated student of divine teachings", implying that he was trained in both medicine and theology prior to becoming bishop. He used his medical training to treat the faithful during the Great Persecution. Eusebius and Theodotus were probably born around the same time. They were close friends and ecclesiastical allies throughout their episcopal careers. Eusebius dedicated two apologetic works, Praeparatio evangelica and Demonstratio evangelica, both written between about 312 and 318, to Theodotus.

In the Trinitarian controversy of the early fourth century, Theodotus sided with Arius of Alexandria. In a letter to Eusebius of Nicomedia around 321, Arius named Theodotus as one of his eastern supporters along with Eusebius of Caesarea, Paulinus of Tyre, Athanasius of Anazarbus, Gregory of Berytus and Aëtius of Lydda. According to Arius' chief rival, Athanasius of Alexandria, Theodotus wrote in support of Arius, but he does not quote any of his writings.

Theodotus attended the provincial council of Antioch held in late 324 or early 325. He was one of only three bishops (Note: The others were Eusebius of Caesarea and Narcisuss of Neronias.) who refused to subscribe to the council's statement of faith, which was based on the theology of the bishop of Alexandria, Alexander I. They were excommunicated pending their recantation at the "great and holy synod" scheduled for June 325. Theodotus attended the synod, which took place in Nicaea, and subscribed to the Nicene Creed, probably on the basis of the explanation of terminology given by the Emperor Constantine I. Three months after Nicaea, Constantine banished Eusebius of Nicomedia and Theognis of Nicaea for communicating with some of Arius' deposed supporters. Shortly after, he wrote to Theodotus warning him from committing the same error.

Theodotus attended the council in Antioch in late 327 that deposed Bishop Eustathius of Antioch on charges of Sabellianism. He may have presided over the council of bishops that met in 328 to elect a new bishop of Antioch. His last known act was the excommunication of Apollinarius the Elder and his son, Apollinarius the Younger. They had been part of a group of Christians attending a lecture by the sophist Epiphanius of Syria. According to custom, Epiphanius dismissed the "uninitiated and profane" (a cue to Christians to leave) before reciting a hymn to the pagan god Dionysus. The Apollinarii and some other Christians stayed throughout. Theodotus reprimanded them and excommunicated the Apollinarii father and son for setting a bad example, since they were a presbyter and lector in the church, respectively. They were readmitted to communion after repentance. This took place sometime between about 328 and 335. By 335, George of Alexandria had replaced Theodotus as bishop of Laodicea.

Constantine's letter implies that Theodotus was a leading figure among those supporters of Arius who signed the Nicene Creed. Theodoret, writing over a century later, considered him one of the leaders of Arianism. Because none of his writing survives, it is impossible to know Theodotus' theology with any exactitude. (Note: Mark DelCogliano considers him part of the "Eusebian alliance" around Eusebius of Caesarea.) He may have defended Arius more out of loyalty to the Alexandrian church, with which Laodicea had strong connections, than out of strong theological agreement. He is sometimes called a Eusebian, that is, a follower of Eusebius of Nicomedia.
