= Prohaeresius =

Armenian teacher

Prohaeresius (Greek: Προαιρέσιος, Prohairesios; c. 276 – c. 368) was a fourth-century Armenian Christian teacher and rhetorician originally from Caesarea who taught in Athens. He was one of the leading sophists of the era along with Diophantus the Arab and Epiphanius of Syria.

== Early life ==
Prior to moving to Athens, Prohaeresius studied under the rhetor Ulpianus of Ascalon in Antioch. In Prohaeresius' student days, he was so poor that he and his friend Hephaestion, having only one decent garment between them, wore it on alternate days.

He also studied under Julianus of Cappadocia, who taught a large number of students. Among Prohaeresius' disciples was also Eunapius. One time the students of Prohaeresius got into a fight with the students of the Spartan Apsines. The matter was taken to Julianus, then an old man who pleaded to Prohaeresius to settle the matter peacefully.

No textbooks written by Prohaeresius survive today, but his influence as a teacher is described by famous sophists and rhetoricians of the second half of the fourth century such as Himerius and Libanius. Many Armenians had travelled to Athens to study under Prohaeresius whom Sozomenos called the most celebrated sophist of his age.

== Rome ==
Attracted by the fame of this genius of erudition, the emperor Constans invited him to his palace in Gaul and entertained him magnificently, though the guest was very simple and ascetic in habits. He was then sent by the emperor to Rome, where he became an object of popular veneration, culminating in the erection of his statue, which bore the inscription Regina rerum Roma, Regi Eloquentiae, i.e., "(from) Rome, the queen of cities, to the king of eloquence".

Prohaeresius also received an honorary praetorian prefecture from the emperor. Some of his other notable students were Gregory of Nazianzus and Basil the Great. The historian Eunapius was Prohaeresius' favorite student and biographer. Eunapius reported that when the emperor Julian the Apostate banned Christians from holding chairs of education in 362, Prohaeresius was among them.

Prohaeresius was given a special dispensation. Julian the Apostate, a scholarly man who was made emperor against his desire in 361, greatly admired Prohaeresius, and in a letter spoke of his "exuberant and overflowing stream of speech...mighty in discourse, just like Pericles". In the hope of winning Prohaeresius to Theurgy, Julian maintained him in a professorial chair, dismissing all others; but Prohaeresius remained loyal to his faith, and voluntarily resigned his lucrative post.

Otherwise, Eunapius described Prohaeresius in pagan terms by comparing him to famous Greek mythological figures (Geryon and Hermes) and Athenian ruler Peisistratus. Overall Eunapius presented his teacher Prohaeresius as an icon of Hellenic holiness.

== Cultural depictions ==
Prohaeresius is depicted in a novella by the 19th-century Armenian author Raffi titled Paruyr Haykazn (1884; published in English translation as Prohaeresius). In the work, Raffi imagines a meeting between Prohaeresius and the Armenian historian Movses Khorenatsi, contrasting Khorenatsi's contributions to his own nation with Prohaeresius's contributions to a foreign one. The 20th-century Armenian writer Moushegh Ishkhan wrote a play with the same premise titled Paruyr Haykazn yev Movses Khorenatsi.
