= Epiphanius of Petra =

Epiphanius of Petra (Ancient Greek: Ἐπιφάνιος ὁ Πετραῖος), also called Epiphanius of Syria, was an Arab sophist and rhetorician at Athens in the first half of the fourth century AD.

He is described as coming from Petra in Arabia by the Suda, a ninth-century Byzantine encyclopaedia, but as coming from Syria by Eunapius. This is not necessarily a contradiction, since urban Arabs frequently identified as Syrian. The Suda calls another sophist, Callinicus of Petra, both a Syrian and an Arabian. Epiphanius was the son of a certain Ulpian, probably not the same person as the sophist Ulpian of Antioch. He was a pupil of Julian of Cappadocia.

That Epiphanius was a pagan is known from an incident in Laodicea, where he was on close terms with two prominent local Christians, Apollinarius the Elder and his son, Apollinarius the Younger. Sometime between 328 and 335 they attended one of his lectures. According to custom, Epiphanius dismissed the "uninitiated and profane" (a cue to Christians to leave) before reciting a hymn to Dionysus. The Apollinarii were among some Christians who remained, for which Bishop Theodotus excommunicated them.

According to the Suda, Epiphanius taught rhetoric at Petra and Athens, where he succeeded Julian. Eunapius says that he only taught students from the east. He was at the height of his fame when Libanius arrived in Athens in 336. Although Libanius intended to study under him, some pupils of Diophantus the Arab forced him to join their master instead. Eunapius describes Epiphanius as skilled in the analysis of questions but weak in discourse. Vindonius Anatolius considered him pedantically precise. His name appears paired with that of Genethlius of Petra in Zosimus' scholia on Demosthenes. Zosimus calls him "the theorist" and seems to have learned of Genethlius through his writings. There is also an allusion to Epiphanius in Menander's scholia on Demosthenes. He seems to have specialised in issue-theory (the framing of questions) and some fragments on this topic may be from his otherwise lost work On the Similarity and Difference of the Issues.

Epiphanius did not live to old age. He and his wife, who was renowned for her beauty, both died childless from blood poisoning. This happened many years before Eunapius arrived in Athens in 362. The Suda lists the works of Epiphanius as:

- On the Similarity and Difference of the Issues
- Progymnasmata
- Declamations
- Demarchs
- Polemarchikos
- epideictic speeches
- miscellaneous theoretical investigations

== Bibliography ==
- DelCogliano, Mark (2008). "The Eusebian Alliance: The Case of Theodotus of Laodicea" (PDF). Zeitschrift für antikes Christentum. 12 (2): 250–266. doi:10.1515/ZAC.2008.017.
- Heath, Malcolm (2004). Menander: A Rhetor in Context. Oxford University Press.
- Lieu, Samuel N. C. (2004). "Scholars and Students in the Roman East". In R. MacLeod (ed.). The Library of Alexandria: Centre of Learning in the Ancient World. I. B. Tauris. pp. 127–142.
- Martindale, John R.; Jones, A. H. M.; Morris, John, eds. (1971). "Epiphanius 1". The Prosopography of the Later Roman Empire: Volume I, AD 260–395. Cambridge: Cambridge University Press. pp. 280–281. ISBN 0-521-07233-6.
- Penella, Robert J. (1990). Greek Philosophers and Sophists in the Fourth Century A.D.: Studies in Eunapius of Sardis. F. Cairns.
- Potter, D. S. (1990). Prophecy and History in the Crisis of the Roman Empire: A Historical Commentary on the Thirteenth Sibylline Oracle. Oxford University Press.
- Smith, William, ed. (1880). "Epiphanius 10". Dictionary of Greek and Roman Biography and Mythology. London: John Murray. p. 40.
