= Eunapius =

Greek sophist and historian

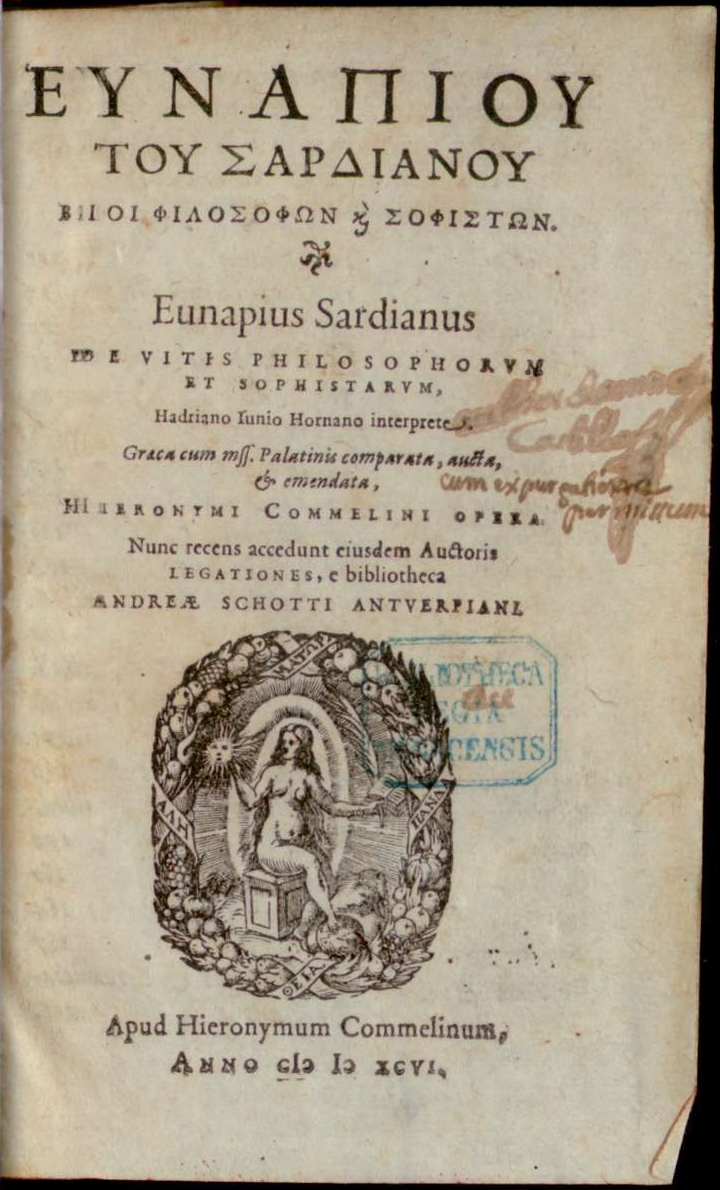
Title page of the Vitae sophistarum of Eunapius, in Greek and Latin, 1596

Eunapius (Greek: Εὐνάπιος; c. 347 – c. 420) was a Greek sophist, rhetorician, and historian from Sardis in the region of Lydia in Asia Minor. His principal surviving work is the Lives of Philosophers and Sophists (Ancient Greek: Βίοι Φιλοσόφων καὶ Σοφιστῶν; Latin: Vitae sophistarum), a collection of the biographies of 24 philosophers and sophists.

== Life ==
He was born at Sardis, around the year 347 AD. While still a youth, he went to Athens, where he became a pupil of Prohaeresius the rhetorician. Back in his native city, he studied under his relative, the sophist Chrysanthius. Additionally, he possessed considerable knowledge of medicine.

In his later years, he seems to have lived at Athens, teaching rhetoric. He was initiated into the Eleusinian Mysteries by the last Hierophant, Nestorius. There is evidence that he was still living during the reign of Theodosius II, as he mentions an event that happened in 414 AD. The exact date of his death is unknown, but it is speculated to have been around 420 AD.

== Writing ==
Eunapius was the author of two works, one entitled Lives of Philosophers and Sophists, and Universal History consisting of a continuation of the history of Dexippus. The former work is still extant; of the latter only the Constantinian excerpts remain, but the facts are largely incorporated in the work of Zosimus. It embraced the history of events from AD 270–404.

The Lives of Philosophers and Sophists, a collection of the biographies of 24 older and contemporary philosophers and sophists, is valuable as the only source for the history of the (mostly neoplatonic) pagan philosophy of that period. The style of both works is marked by a spirit of bitter hostility to Christianity. Photius had before him a "new edition" of the history in which the passages most offensive to Christians were omitted.

The Lives of Philosophers and Sophists consists of the biographies of the following philosophers and sophists: Plotinus, Porphyry, Iamblichus, Aedesius the Cappadocian, Maximus, Priscus, Chrysanthius, Epigonus, Beronicianus, Julian of Cappadocia, Prohaeresius, Epiphanius, Diophantus the Arab, Sopolis, Himerius, Parnasius, Libanius, Acacius, Nymphidianus, Zeno of Cyprus, Magnus, Oribasius, Ionicus, and Theon.

== Editions and translations ==
- Edition of the Lives by JF Boissonade (1822), with notes by D Wyttenbach
- History fragments in Karl Wilhelm Ludwig Müller, Fragmenta Historicorum Graecorum, iv.
- V. Cousin, Fragments philosophiques (1865), translation: W. C. Wright in the Loeb Classical Library edition of Philostratus's Lives of the Sophists (1921).
- Philostratus, Lives of the Sophists. Eunapius, Lives of the Philosophers and Sophists. Translated by Wilmer C. Wright. 1921. Loeb Classical Library. ISBN 978-0-674-99149-1

== Bibliography ==
- Hartmann, Udo (2018). Der spätantike Philosoph. Die Lebenswelten der paganen Gelehrten und ihre hagiographische Ausgestaltung in den Philosophenviten von Porphyrios bis Damaskios (in German). Bonn: Habelt. pp. 118–184. ISBN 978-3-7749-4172-4.
