= Anonymous Syriac Commentary on the Apocalypse =

The Anonymous Syriac Commentary on the Apocalypse is the earliest commentary on the Book of Revelation in the Syriac language, dating from before the year 1000.

== Manuscript ==
The Anonymous Syriac Commentary is known from a single manuscript, now London, British Library, Add. MS 17127. The copy of the Commentary was produced in the Syriac monastic community at Nitria in Egypt in 1088. The scribe was the priest Samuel, son of Quryaqos. He reused parchment from an existing manuscript of the eighth or ninth century, which contained the only known copy of Gessius of Petra's commentary on Galen, in Syriac translation. Add. 17127 is thus a palimpsest, with the Anonymous Syriac Commentary being the overtext and the erased work of Gessius the undertext. Samuel used leaves from the Gessian manuscript for at least four other works.

The text of the Commentary is not complete, since the first leaf has been lost. The lost text covered verses 1:1–6. As Revelation was poorly received in the Syriac churches, few early copies survive. Add. 17127 contains the earliest mostly complete text of Revelation in Syriac, although it quotes only about 70% of the book. Every verse from 1:7 through 14:5 is quoted, but thereafter quotations are sporadic.

== Authorship and date ==
The text of Revelation used by the Commentary is the translation of Thomas of Harkel, made in Egypt around 615 for the Syro-Hexaplar version. The anonymous commentator was working from the Syriac text and not a Greek one, as demonstrated by his comments on a mistranslation. Theologically, he was of the Miaphysite persuasion.

The "elaborate" commentary is a complete one, covering essentially the entire book. It takes up 92 parchment leaves or 184 pages. Like the manuscript and the translation, it was created within the Syriac community in Egypt. It must date later than 686, since it cites the Syriac translation of the Testamentum Domini made in that year by James of Edessa, and earlier than 1088, the date of the manuscript. Stan Larson, who edited the commentary and translated it into English, considers it a work of the 9th or 10th century. Thomas Schmidt places it closer to the year 700 because it mentions neither the rise of Islam or the Third Council of Constantinople of 680–681.

== Contents ==
=== Sources ===
The anonymous commentator quotes 466 times from the Bible (other than Revelation). From the Old Testament, he especially favours the Psalms and Isaiah. More than one third of all biblical quotation are from those two books. He also quotes from the New Testament, although enver from the catholic epistles, which, like Revelation itself, were not often accepted as canon in the Syriac churches. He does not shy, however, from quoting the apocryphal Wisdom of Solomon and Testamentum Domini.

The commentator makes no use of Greek sources.

=== Interpretive approach ===
The Commentary is divided into 72 chapter, each led by the text to be interpreted. The commentator identifies the author of Revelation with John the Apostle. Although Revelation had a rocky reception in Syriac circles, the commentator has nothing but praise for "the great, amazing, and gracious Apocalypse". Perhaps because of the poor reception of the book amongst his Syriac brethren, the commentator argues that it can be understood only by those few with a "noble mind". Yet it has an important use in refuting misunderstandings of the other scriptures, for it "confounds and disperses" the Nestorians and Arians. The commentator also finds ways to critique the Chalcedonians. Overall, his approach to Revelation is highly Christological.

In his comments on verse 1:19, the commentator states that, when John uses the present tense, he is referring to what has been written down (since it is present in the form of writings) and, when he uses the future tense, he is referring to the future. This allows many passages to be interpreted as rearticulations of the Old Testament and, by extension, to refer to the past.

=== Interpretations ===
The commentator readily classifies passages with terms like allegory (ܦܠܐܬܐ), mystery (ܐܪܙܐ) and type (ܛܘܦܣܐ). Thus, the Seven Spirits of God is read as a reference to the Holy Spirit, with the symbolic number seven signifying perfection. Most of the other septets in Revelation are identified with Christ. The seven stars and angels (1:20), the seven horns and eyes (5:6), the seven trumpets (8:20), the seven thunderclaps (10:3) and the seven plagues (15:1) are all likened to the seven names or titles given to Christ in Isaiah 9:6–7, which the commentator identifies as "Wonderful", "Counsellor", "God", "Mighty Everlasting", "Prince of Peace", "Father of the Age to Come" and, oddly, "There Is No End to the Increase of His Authority and Peace".

In the case of verse 4:1, which many early commentators found difficult, the anonymous Syriac commentator is untroubled. He sees the open door in Heaven as analogus to the opening of Heaven in Ezekiel 1:1. On the other hand, he may have simply ignored issues he found troublesome. He does not even quote the relevant verses which could lead to identifying Babylon the Great with Rome.

A mistranslation at verse 8:13 gives the eagle, which represents God, a "tail of blood". The commentator interprets this as a reference to the crucifixion of Jesus.

In interpreting the four living creatures, the commentator sticks to the tradition that these represent the Four Evangelists. In his tetramorph scheme, the lion is Matthew, the man is Mark, the ox is Luke and the eagle is John. This scheme is also found in the later Syriac commentary by Dionysius bar Salibi. The commentator identifies the letters to the seven churches that open Revelation with seven church councils important to the Miaphysites: Nicaea (325), Constantinople (381), Ephesus (431), Ephesus (449), Chalcedon (451), Tyre (512) and Constantinople (553).

== Legacy ==
The only other Syriac Misaphysite commentary on Revelation is that of Dionysius bar Ṣalibi from the 12th century. The two have very little in common. Bar Ṣalibi's commentary is a little over one tenth as long and cites many Greek and even (indirectly) Latin sources. They also differ extensively in interpretation, especially in their application of the Old Testament. There is no evidence that Bar Ṣalibi new of the earlier commentary.

== Bibliography ==
- Gwynn, John (1877). "On a Syriac MS. belonging to the Collection of Archbishop Ussher" (PDF). The Transactions of the Royal Irish Academy. 27: 269–316.
- Kessel, Grigory (2025). "Beyond the Invisible: Some Aspects of Syriac Palimpsests". In Jost Gippert; José Maksimczuk; Hasmik Sargsyan (eds.). Palimpsests and Related Phenomena Across Languages and Cultures. DeGruyter. pp. 159–220.
- Larson, Stan (1984). The Earliest Syriac Commentary on the Apocalypse: Transcription, Translation and Importance of Brit. Lib. Ms. Add. 17,127 (PhD dissertation). University of Birmingham.
- Larson, Stan (1990). "The Earliest Syriac Commentary on the Apocalypse". In E. A. Livingstone (ed.). Papers of the Ninth International Conference on Patristic Studies, Oxford, 1983. Cistercian Publication. pp. 249–254.
- Schmidt, Thomas C. (2020). The Last Book: Revelation, Commentaries, and the Making of the New Testament (PhD dissertation). Yale University.
- Schmidt, Thomas C. (2021). The Book of Revelation and its Eastern Commentators: Making the New Testament in the Early Christian World. Cambridge University Press.
- Taylor, David G. K. (2017). "L'Apocalypse de Jean en syriaque: des origines à Diamper". In Jean-Claude Haelewyck (ed.). Le Nouveau Testament en syriaque. Geuthner. pp. 27–53.
