= Diophantus the Arab =

Arab teacher

Diophantus the Arab (Ancient Greek: Διόφαντος ὁ Ἀράβιος) was an Arab teacher and sophist at Athens during the 4th century AD. His most famous student was Libanius (336–340). He was active during the reign of Julian the Apostate (361–363).

Diophantus' place of birth within Arabia is unknown. It may have been Petra, also the birthplace of the 5th-century iatrosophist Gessius of Petra and a place associated with Diophantus' contemporary and fellow sophist, Epiphanius of Petra. He is not listed among the rhetors and sophists of Gerasa by Stephanus of Byzantium.

Diophantus was a pupil of Julian of Cappadocia, whom he succeeded as rhetor (teacher of rhetoric) in Athens. According to Eunapius, who attended his lectures in the period 362–367, Diophantus recruited students from Arabia. He was also accused of kidnapping students. According to Libanius' own account, he went to Athens intending to become a student of Epiphanius of Petra, but was ambushed by enthusiasts of Diophantus who imprisoned him in a cell until he took an oath to become Diophantus' student. His oath to Diophantus did not prohibit him from attending other lectures. Libanius records that Diophantus had once also been roughed up by thugs. Diophantus is mentioned in the Byzantine Suda's entry for Libanius.

One of Diophantus' rival teachers in Athens was Prohaeresius, on whose death in 367 he delivered a eulogy quoted in part by Eunapius, who considered him far inferior to Prohaeresius. He died not long after. He left behind two sons whom Eunapius describes as devoted to commercial gain and luxurious living.

Diophantus has sometimes been confused with the more famous mathematician, Diophantus of Alexandria, and his ethnic background (Arab) has sometimes been attributed to the latter. He must also be distinguished from the Egyptian philosopher and priest of mysteries of the same name cited by Libanius in a letter of 362.
