= Lives of the Sophists =

Lives of the Sophists may refer to:

- a book by Eunapius
- a book by Philostratus

== See also ==
- Lives and Opinions of Eminent Philosophers
