= Zeno of Cyprus =

Greek physician

Zeno of Cyprus (Ancient Greek: Ζήνων ὁ Κύπριος) was a Greek physician, a native of Cyprus, and the tutor of Ionicus, Magnus, and Oribasius. Eunapius states that he lived "down to the time of Julian the Sophist", i.e. Julian of Caesarea, who died at Athens in 340.

It is unlikely that he can be identified with the Zeno who practised medicine at Alexandria, and who was expelled by the Bishop George of Cappadocia in 360, before being restored to his post by the emperor Julian, around 361.
