= Nymphidianus of Smyrna =

Nymphidianus (Greek: Νυμφιδιανός) of Smyrna, was a Neoplatonist and sophist who lived in the time of the emperor Julian (c. 360 AD). He was the brother of Maximus. Julian, who was greatly attached to Maximus, made Nymphidianus his interpreter and Greek secretary, though he was more fit to write declamations and disputations than letters. Eunapius thought that Nymphidianus was a worthy sophist even though he had not been educated at Athens (where Eunapius had been educated). Nymphidianus survived his brother Maximus, and died at an advanced age.
