= Tetramorph =

Symbolic arrangement of four differing elements

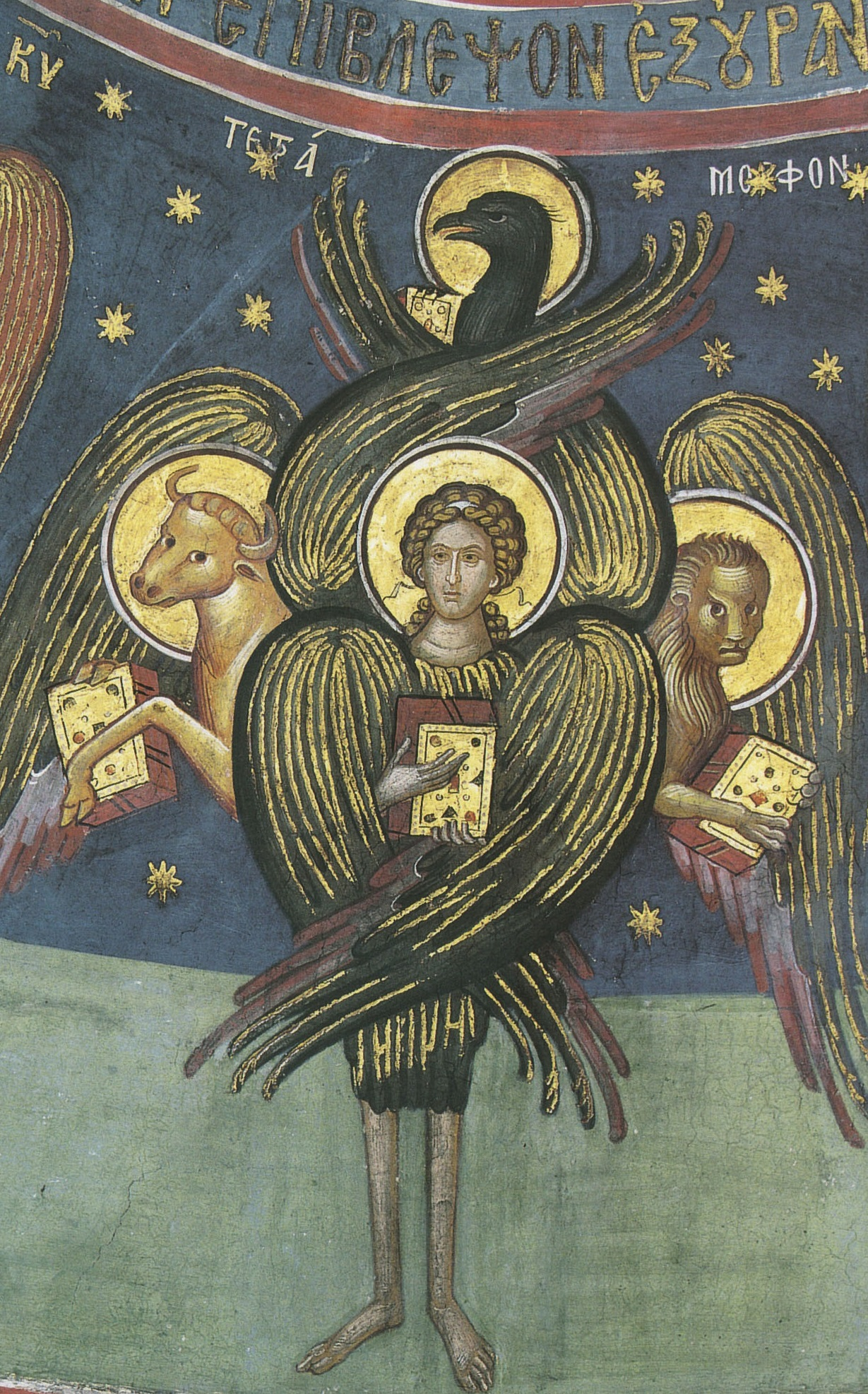
A composition of the Four Living Creatures into one tetramorph. Matthew the man, Mark the lion, Luke the ox, and John the eagle.

A tetramorph is a symbolic arrangement of four differing elements, or the combination of four disparate elements in one unit. The term is derived from the Greek tetra, meaning four, and morph, shape.

The word comes from the Greek for "four forms" or "shapes". In English usage, each symbol may be described as a tetramorph in the singular, and a group as "the tetramorphs", but usually only in contexts where all four are included. The tetramorphs were especially common in Early Medieval art, above all in illuminated Gospel books, but remain common in religious art to the present day.

In Christian art, the tetramorph is the union of the symbols of the Four Evangelists, derived from the four living creatures in the Book of Ezekiel, into a single figure or, more commonly, a group of four figures. Each of the four Evangelists is associated with one of the living creatures, usually shown with wings. The most common association, but not the original or only, is: Mark the King, Lion; Luke the lowly Servant, Ox; Matthew the Angel; and John the Eagle. In Christian art and iconography, Evangelist portraits are often accompanied by tetramorphs, or the symbols alone used to represent them. Evangelist portraits that depict them in their human forms are often accompanied by their symbolic creatures, and Christ in Majesty is often shown surrounded by the four symbols.

== Origins ==
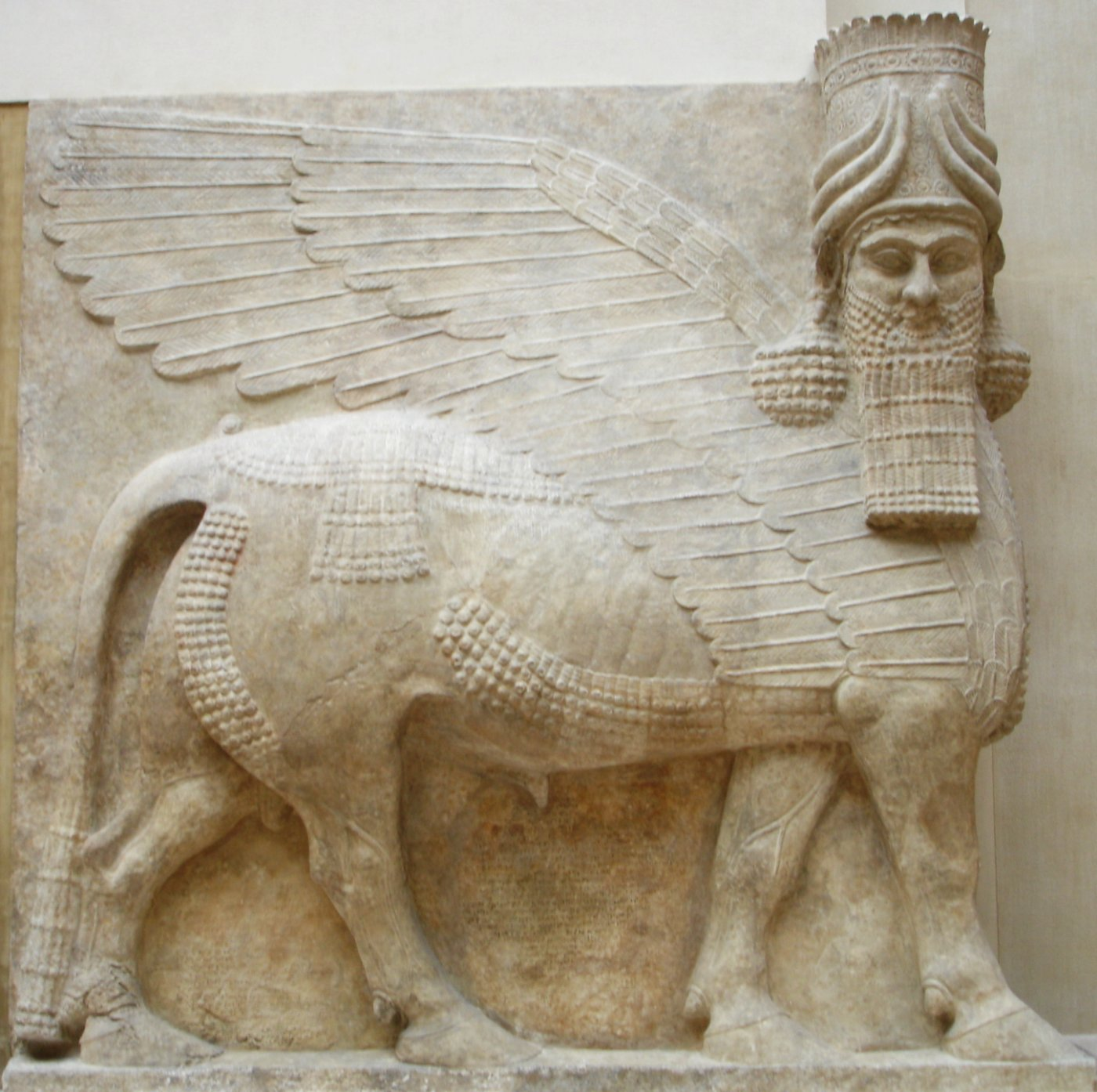
An Assyrian lamassu dated 721 BC.

Images of unions of different elements into one symbol were originally used by the Ancient Egyptians, Assyrians, and Greeks. The image of the sphinx, found in Egypt and Babylon, depicted the body of a lion and the head of a human, while the harpies of Greek mythology showed bird-like human women.

=== Ezekiel's living creatures ===
The prophet Ezekiel lived among the Jews who were exiled to Babylon in the 6th century BC. The creatures in his vision, from which the images of the tetramorph are derived, are reminiscent of ancient Assyrian art.

The animals associated with the Christian tetramorph originate in the Babylonian symbols of the four fixed signs of the zodiac: the ox representing Taurus; the lion representing Leo; the eagle representing Scorpio; the man or angel representing Aquarius. In Western astrology, the four symbols are associated with the elements of, respectively Earth, Fire, Water, and Air. The creatures of the Christian tetramorph were also common in Egyptian, Greek, and Assyrian mythology. The early Christians adopted this symbolism and adapted it for the four Evangelists as the tetramorph, which first appears in Christian art in the 5th century, but whose interpretative origin stems from Irenaeus in the 2nd century.

The elements of the Christian tetramorph first appear in the vision of Ezekiel, who describes the four creatures as they appear to him in a vision:

As for the likeness of their faces, they four had the face of a man, and the face of a lion, on the right side: and they four had the face of an ox on the left side; they four also had the face of an eagle.

They are described later in the Book of Revelation:

And the first beast was like a lion, and the second beast like a calf, and the third beast had a face as a man, and the fourth beast was like a flying eagle.

=== The four evangelists as four living creatures ===
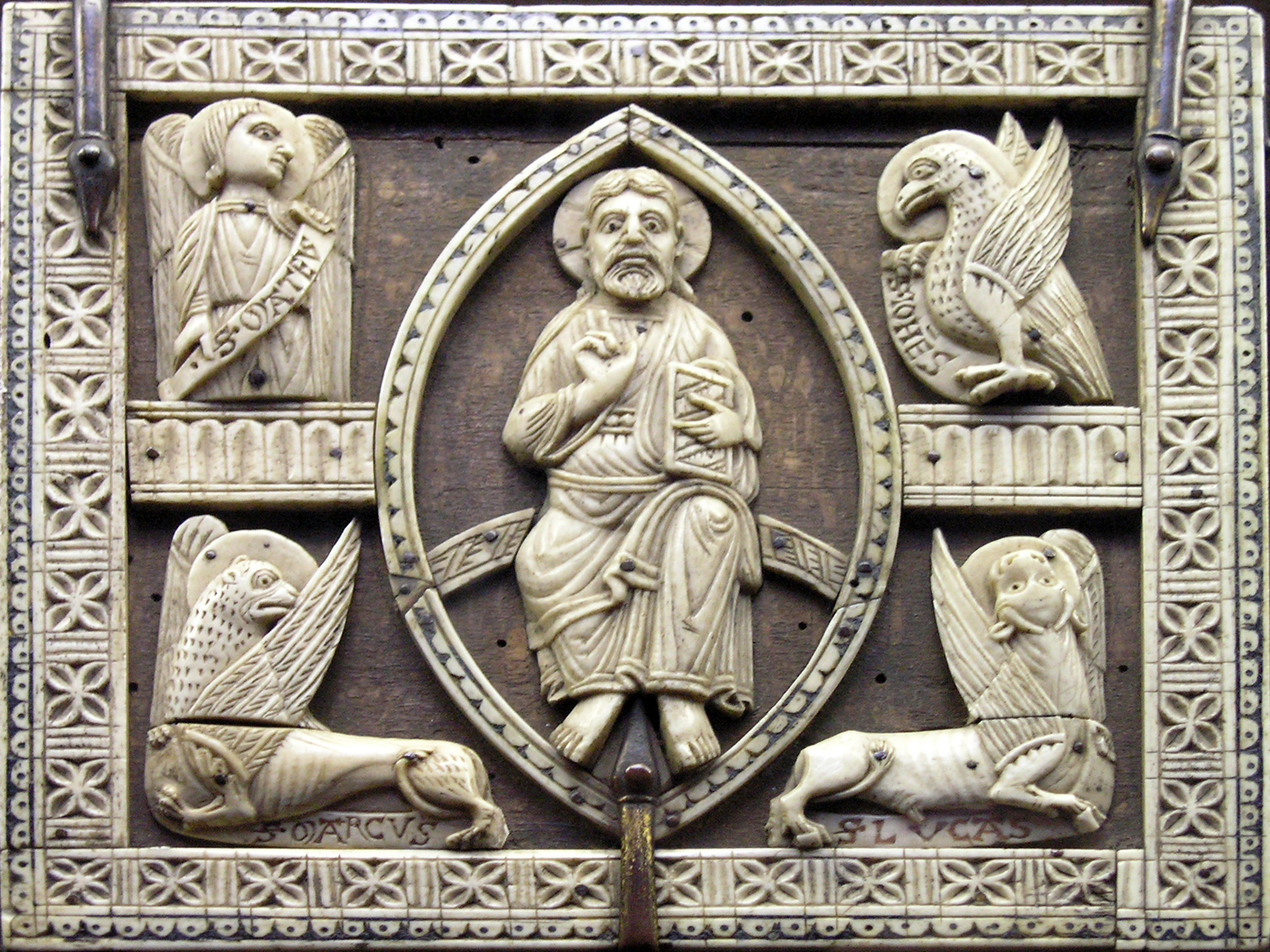
A 13th-century ivory carving of Christ in Majesty surrounded by the creatures of the tetramorph, in the Musée de Cluny, Paris.

The association of the four living creatures with the four evangelists originated with Irenaeus in the 2nd century. The interpretation of each creature has varied through church history. The most common interpretation, first laid out by Victorinus and adopted by Jerome, St Gregory, and the Book of Kells, is that the man is Matthew, the lion Mark, the ox Luke, and the eagle John. The creatures of the tetramorph, just like the four gospels of the Evangelists, represent four facets of Christ.

Source and scheme		Man	Lion	Calf	Eagle
Irenaeus (130–202)	1	Matthew	John	Luke	Mark
Hippolytus of Rome (170–235)	3	Mark	Matthew	Luke	John
Victorinus of Pettau (d. 304)	1	Matthew	John	Luke	Mark
Fortunatianus of Aquileia (c. 300-370)	1	(Unknown)	John	(Unknown)	Mark
Epiphanius of Salamis (310–403)	2	Matthew	Mark	Luke	John
Chromatius of Aquileia (d. 407)	1	Matthew	John	Luke	Mark
Jerome (347–420)	2	Matthew	Mark	Luke	John
Pseudo-Athanasius (c. 350)	6	Matthew	Luke	Mark	John
Ambrose (340–397)	2	Matthew	Mark	Luke	John
Augustine of Hippo (354–430)	3	Mark	Matthew	Luke	John
Primasius of Hadrumetum (d. 560)	3	Mark	Matthew	Luke	John
Pope Gregory I (540–604)	2	Matthew	Mark	Luke	John
Anonymous Syriac Commentator (c. 700)	3	Mark	Matthew	Luke	John
Book of Durrow (c. 700)	1	Matthew	John	Luke	Mark
Lindisfarne Gospels (c. 715)	2	Matthew	Mark	Luke	John
Book of Kells (c. 800)	2	Matthew	Mark	Luke	John
Adam of Saint Victor (d. 1146)	2	Matthew	Mark	Luke	John
Theophylact of Ohrid (c. 1055–1107+)	1	Matthew	John	Luke	Mark
Thomas Aquinas (1225–1274)	2	Matthew	Mark	Luke	John
Jamieson-Fausset-Brown Bible Commentary (1873)	4	Luke	Matthew	Mark	John
Watchman Nee (1903–1972)	4	Luke	Matthew	Mark	John
Aimee Semple McPherson (1890–1944)	5	Luke	John	Mark	Matthew
Harry A. Ironside (1876–1951)	4	Luke	Matthew	Mark	John
Scofield Reference Bible (1967 ed.)	4	Luke	Matthew	Mark	John

It is clear from the table that various interpretive schemes have been followed through church history. The five main schemes are summarized below with a representative proponent and rationale. The given rationale usually has to do with how each Gospel begins, major themes in each Gospel, or the aspect of Christ emphasized in each Gospel.

1st scheme—Irenaeus

The man is Matthew, because his Gospel begins with the genealogy of Jesus; the lion is John, because his Gospel begins full of confidence; the ox is Luke, because his Gospel begins with priestly sacrifice; and the eagle is Mark, because his Gospel begins with the prophecy of Isaiah. Irenaeus originates this connection between the four living creatures and the four evangelists because he is looking for an answer to the question "Why four Gospels?"

2nd scheme (most common)—Jerome

The rationale given for this scheme is how each Gospel narrative begins. Matthew is the man because he begins with a genealogy; Mark is the lion, roaring in the desert with prophetic power; Luke is the ox, because he begins with temple sacrifice; and John is the eagle, flying heavenwards like the divine Word. It must be said that at a certain point, once enough interpretive authorities in the church backed this scheme, many who followed simply defaulted to their authority.

3rd scheme—Augustine

The lion is Matthew, because Matthew's Gospel depicts Christ royal character, he who descended from the tribe of Judah; the ox is Luke, because Christ is shown in his priestly character; the man is Mark, because of the humanity of Christ shown in that Gospel focusing on the things the man did; and the eagle is John, because the mystery of the Word ascends to heaven. Augustine departs from Jerome's scheme saying, "This latter formulation focuses only on the beginnings of the books and not on the overall plan of the evangelists, which is what should have been examined more thoroughly."

4th scheme—Jamieson-Fausset-Brown

The lion is Matthew, because Matthew portrays the Lord Jesus as the King; the ox is Mark, because Mark portrays Him as a servant; the man is Luke, because Luke portrays Him as a perfect, genuine man; the eagle is John, because John portrays Him as God. This view takes the creatures as symbols of "not the personal character of the Evangelists, but the manifold aspect of Christ... presented by them severally."

5th scheme—Aimee Semple McPherson

The Eagle is Matthew, who presents Jesus as the King who will soon return to seek his people, Jesus Will Return; the ox is Luke, where he presents Jesus as the suffering servant who bore our sickness, Jesus Healing; The Face of Man (representing Mark) presents Jesus as the perfect man who came to save us, Jesus Saves; The Lion is John presents Jesus as the Baptizer in the Holy Spirit.

== The tetramorph in art ==
=== Representation and symbolism in Christianity ===
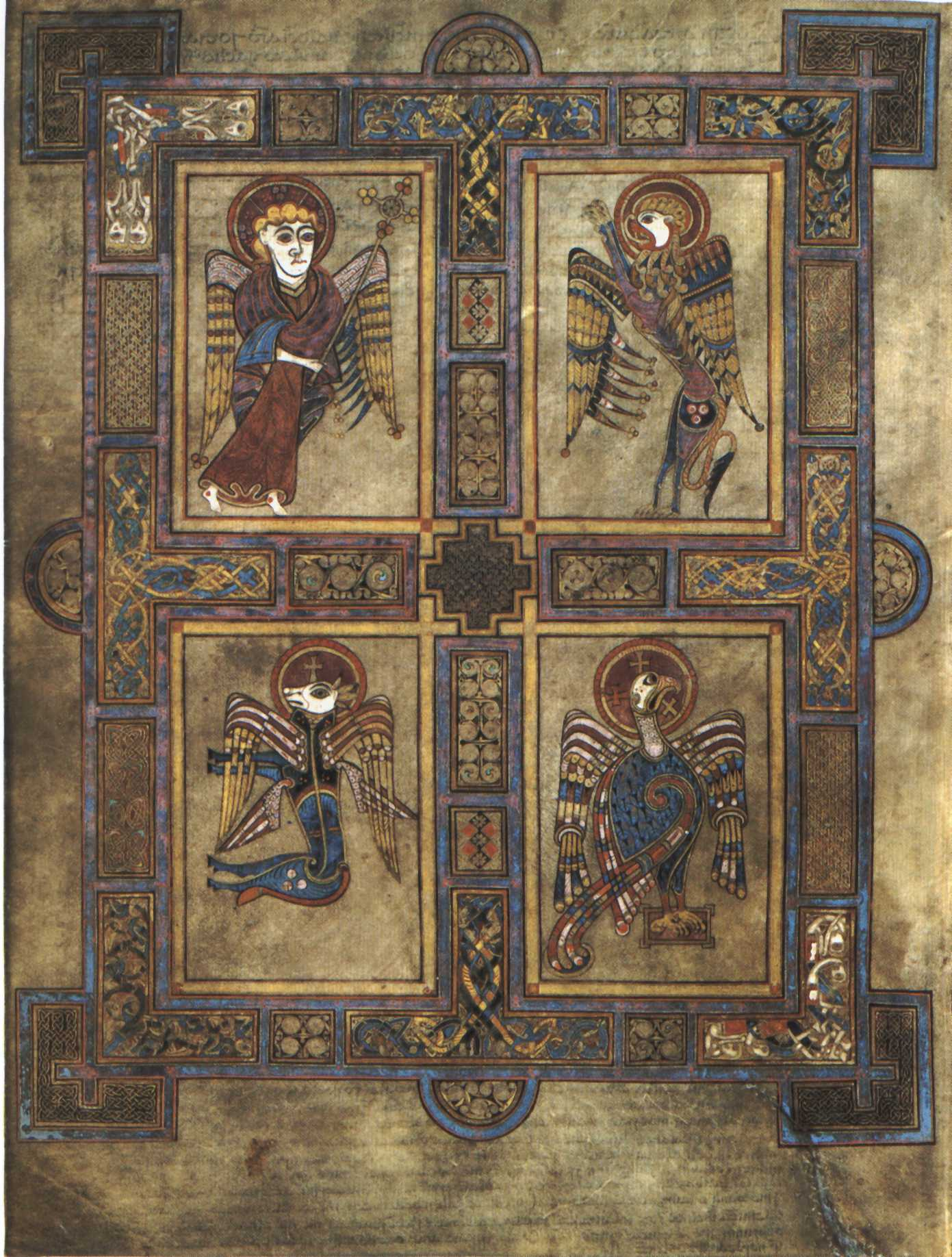
The Four Evangelists as illustrated in the Book of Kells, c. 800 AD.

The creatures of the tetramorph, as they appear in their animal forms, are predominantly shown as winged figures. The wings, an ancient symbol of divinity, represent the divinity of the Evangelists, the divine nature of Christ, and the virtues required for Christian salvation. In regards to the depiction of St Mark in particular, the use of wings distinguish him from images of St Jerome, who is also associated with the image of a lion.

The perfect human body of Christ was originally represented as a winged man, and was later adapted for St Matthew in order to symbolise Christ's humanity. In the context of the tetramorphs, the winged man indicates Christ's humanity and reason, as well as Matthew's account of the Incarnation of Christ. The lion of St Mark represents courage, resurrection, and royalty, coinciding with the theme of Christ as king in Mark's gospel. It is also interpreted as the Lion of Judah as a reference to Christ's royal lineage. The ox, or bull, is an ancient Christian symbol of redemption and life through sacrifice, signifying Luke's records of Christ as a priest and his ultimate sacrifice for the future of humanity. The eagle represents the sky, heavens, and the human spirit, paralleling the divine nature of Christ.

In their earliest appearances, the Evangelists were depicted in their human forms each with a scroll or a book to represent the Gospels. By the 5th century, images of the Evangelists evolved into their respective tetramorphs. By the later Middle Ages, the tetramorph in the form of creatures was used less frequently. Instead, the Evangelists were often shown in their human forms accompanied by their symbolic creatures, or as men with the heads of animals.

In images where the creatures surround Christ, the winged man and the eagle are often depicted at Christ's sides, with the lion and the ox positioned lower by his feet, with the man on Christ's right, taking precedence over the eagle, and the lion to the left of the ox. These positions reflect the medieval great chain of being.

=== Depictions in Christian art ===
==== Architecture ====
The use of the tetramorph in architecture is most common in the decoration of Christian churches. On medieval churches, the symbols of the Evangelists are usually found above westerly-facing portals and in the eastern apse, particularly surrounding the enthroned figure of Christ in Glory in scenes of the Last Judgment. This image of Christ in Glory often features Christ pantocrator in a mandorla surrounded by the creatures of the tetramorph is often found on the spherical ceiling inside the apse, typically as a mosaic or fresco. Older Roman churches, such as Santa Pudenziana and Santa Maria in Trastevere, mosaics often depict the four creatures in a straight line rather than in a circular formation.

Medieval churches also feature sculptures of bas-relief symbols of the Evangelists on western facades, externally around eastern apse windows, or as large statues atop apse walls. Generally all four creatures of the tetramorph will be found together in either one image or in one structure, but it is not unheard of to have a single Evangelist dominate the imagery of the church. This is usually found in cities that bear one of the Evangelists as their patron saint. A notable example is St Mark's Basilica in Venice, where the winged lion is the city's mascot and St Mark is the city's patron saint.

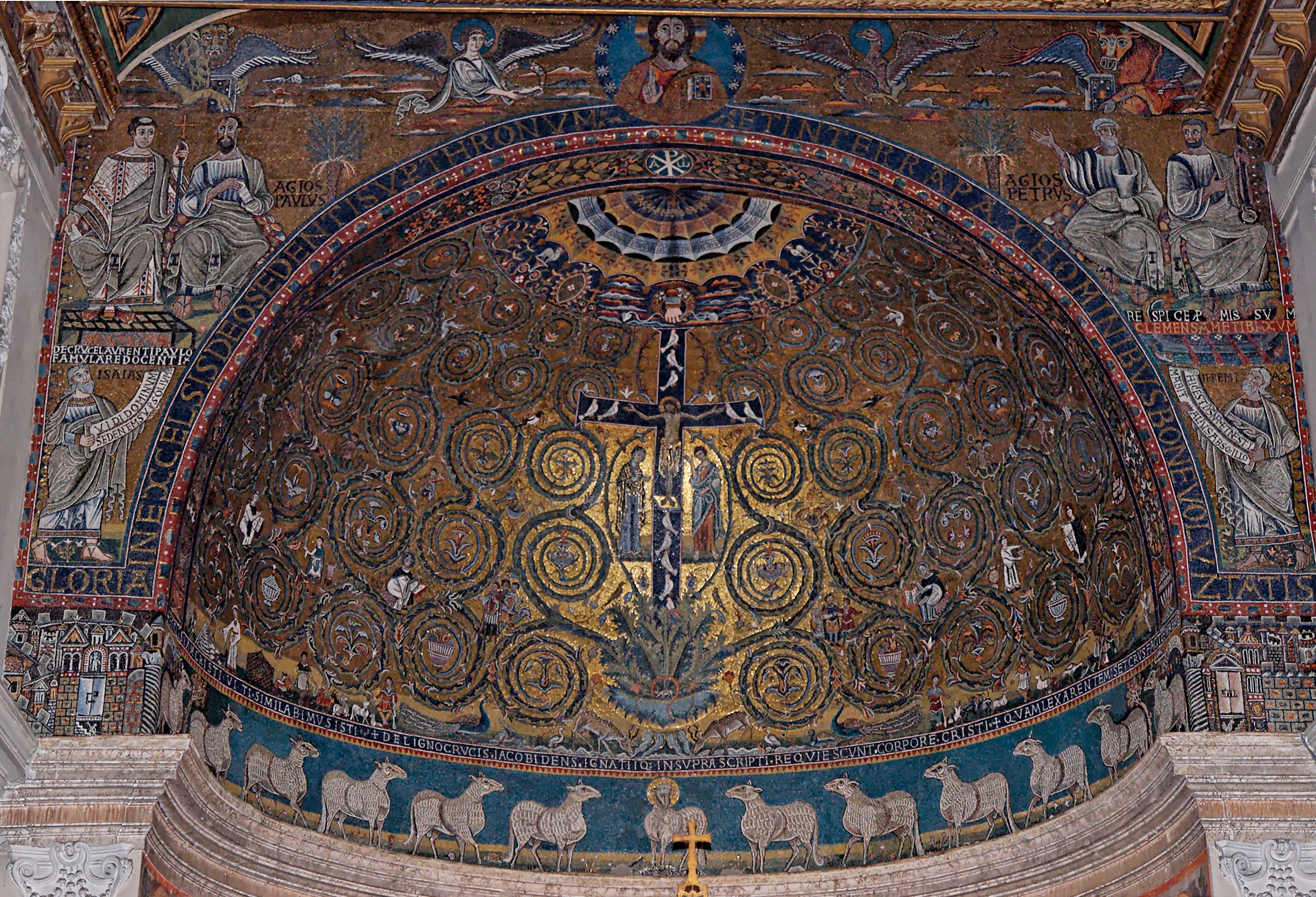
12th-century apse mosaic from Basilica di San Clemente in Rome.

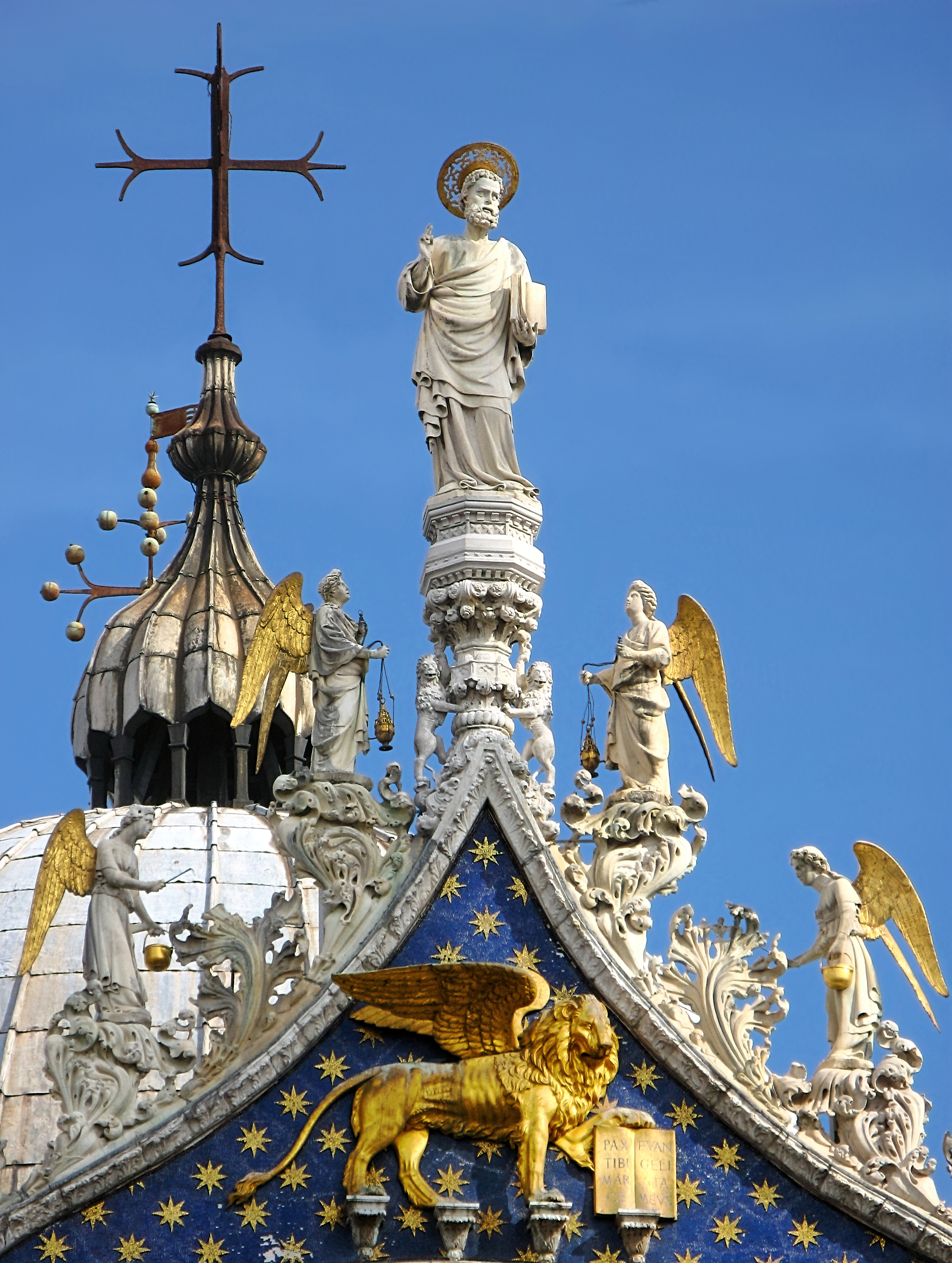
Detail of the rooftop of San Marco cathedral in Venice.

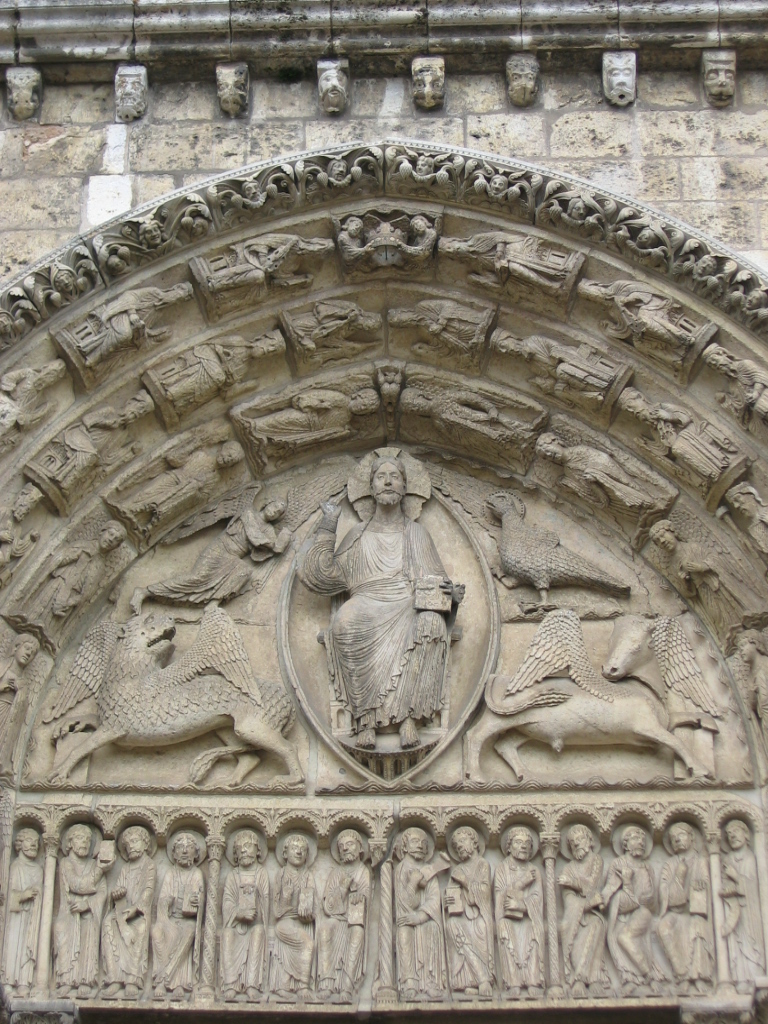
Central portal of Chartres Cathedral in Chartres.

==== Painting and manuscript illumination ====
Most illuminated Gospel books were prefaced with Evangelist portraits, often combined on a single page. Insular manuscripts were very focused on abstract linear patterns that combined Mediterranean, Anglo-Saxon and Celtic influences, the latter mostly traceable from surviving metalwork. The artists of the period were initially more comfortable with images of animals than humans, so in early Gospel Books the Evangelists were represented as tetramorphic symbols rather than portraits. Their preferences for abstract, geometric, and stylized art led to a lot of differences in portrayals of the tetramorphs. Celtic artists would paint the creatures in a relatively realistic fashion, or their divine nature would be emphasised through the inclusion of wings or human traits, such as hands in place of talons or the animal standing upright.

The Evangelists and tetramorphs were highly featured in Ottonian manuscripts as the Gospel books, pericopes, and the Apocalypse were most popular. While they imitated the Byzantine artistic style, Carolingian illuminations consciously revived the early Christian style, and was much more elaborate than Celtic or Insular art.

For most illuminated manuscript portraits, the Evangelist typically occupied a full page. Though numerous examples of Late Antique portraits featured each figure in a standing position, the Evangelists were predominantly depicted in a seated position at a writing desk or with a book or scroll, both in reference to the Gospels. The symbols of the tetramorphs were most common in the Middle Ages until the Romanesque period before they fell out of favour and images of the Evangelists in their human forms became more common. However, the tetramorphs were still used and were found in artwork of the Renaissance and even in modern art. A notable 20th century example is the massive tapestry by Graham Sutherland (1962) which hangs in Coventry Cathedral.

St Mark as the lion as depicted in the Echternach Gospels, c. 800, Hiberno-Saxon.

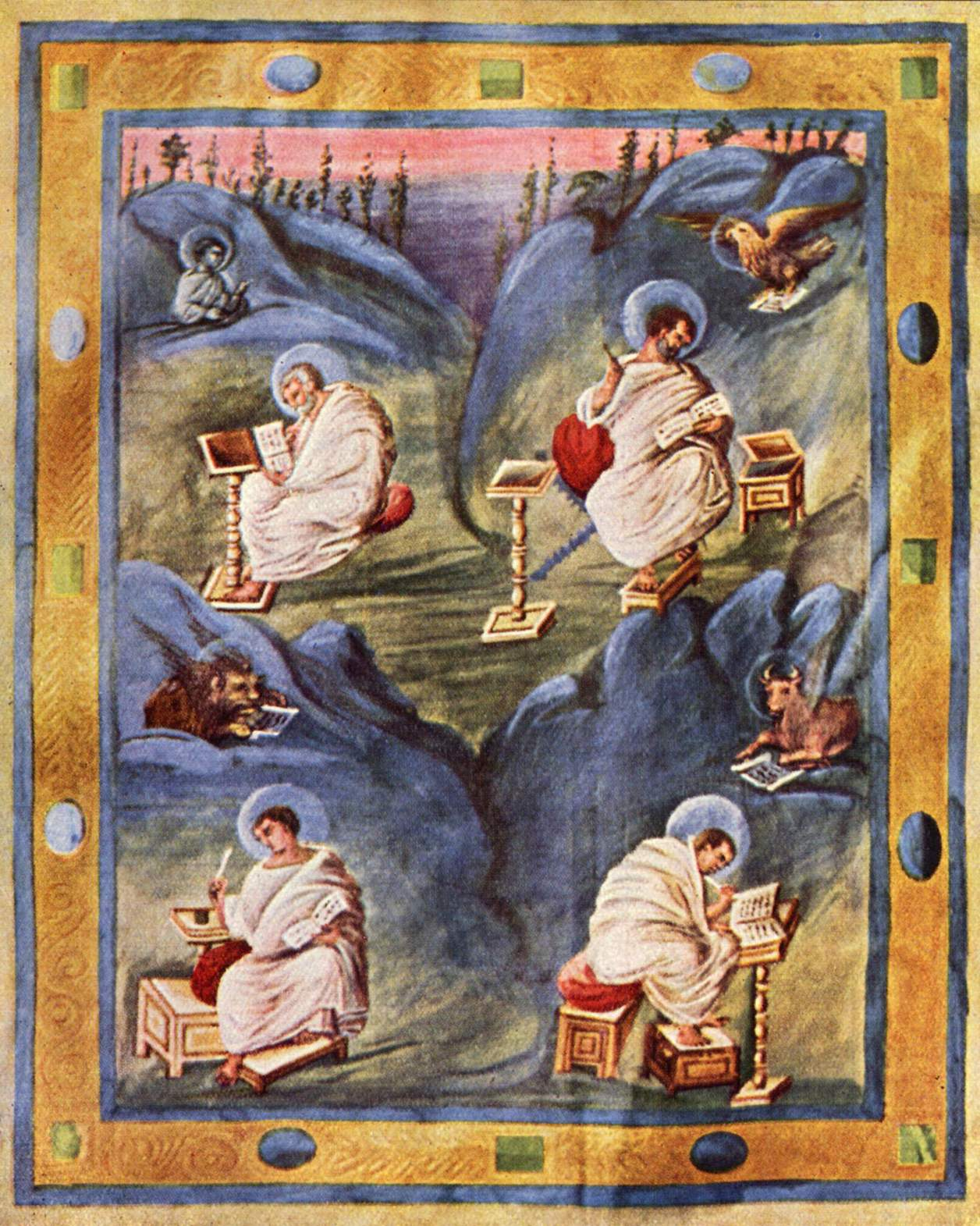
Illumination of the four Evangelists with their symbols, c. 820, Carolingian.

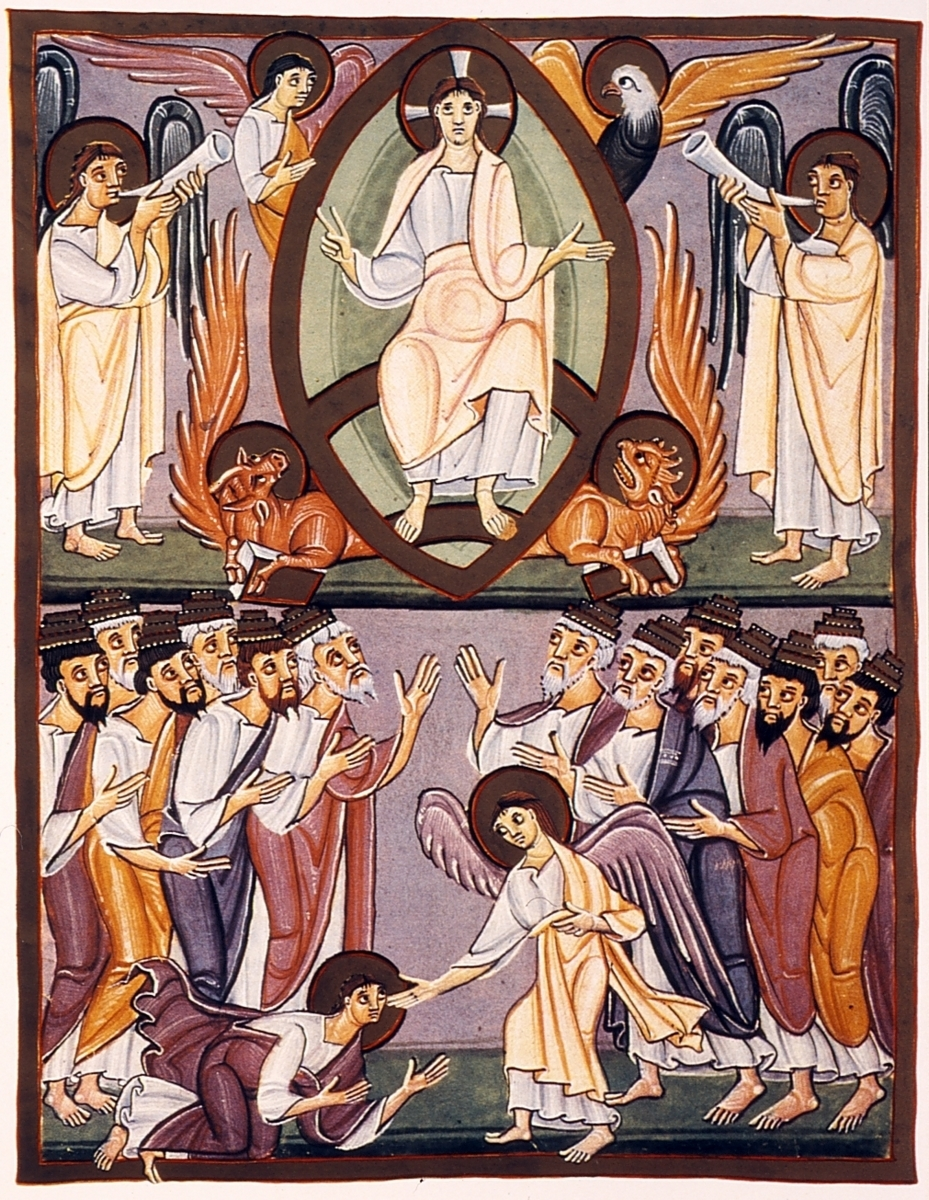
Christ and the tetramorphs in the Bamberg Apocalypse, c. 1000, Ottonian.

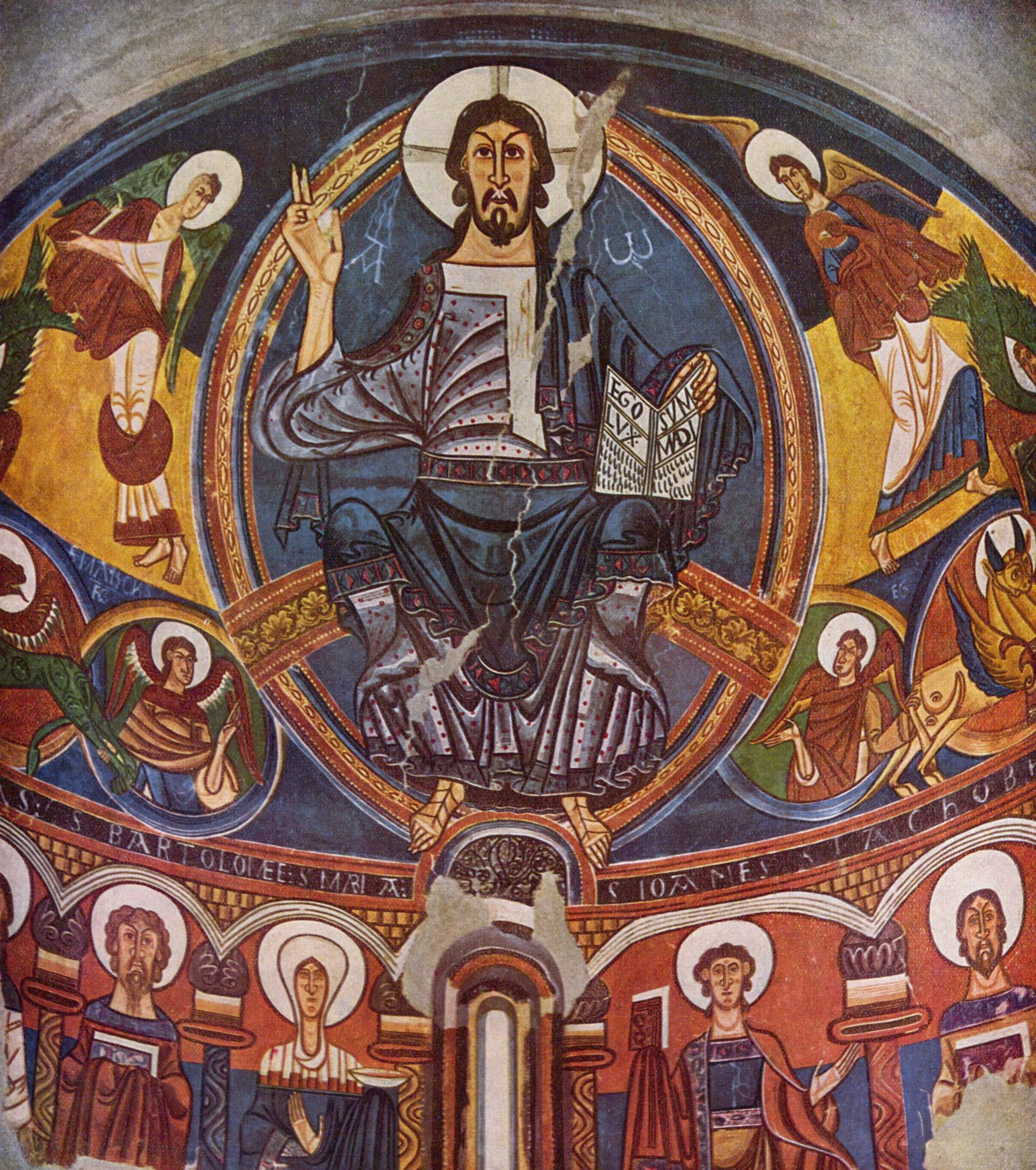
Christ surrounded by the Evangelists, c. 1123, Romanesque fresco.

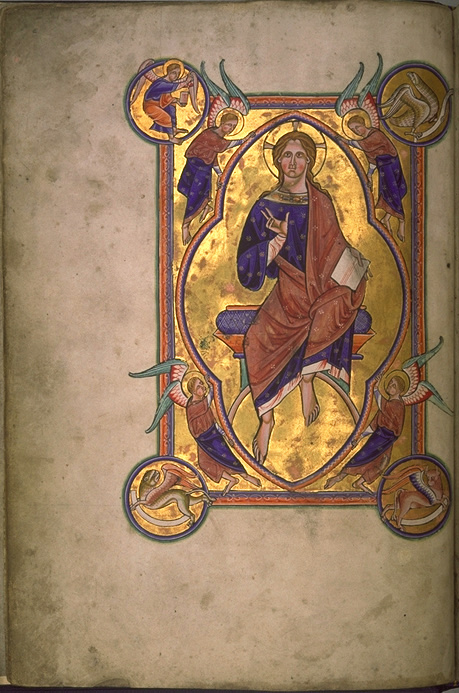
Christ in Majesty from the Aberdeen Bestiary, c. 12th century, manuscript illumination.

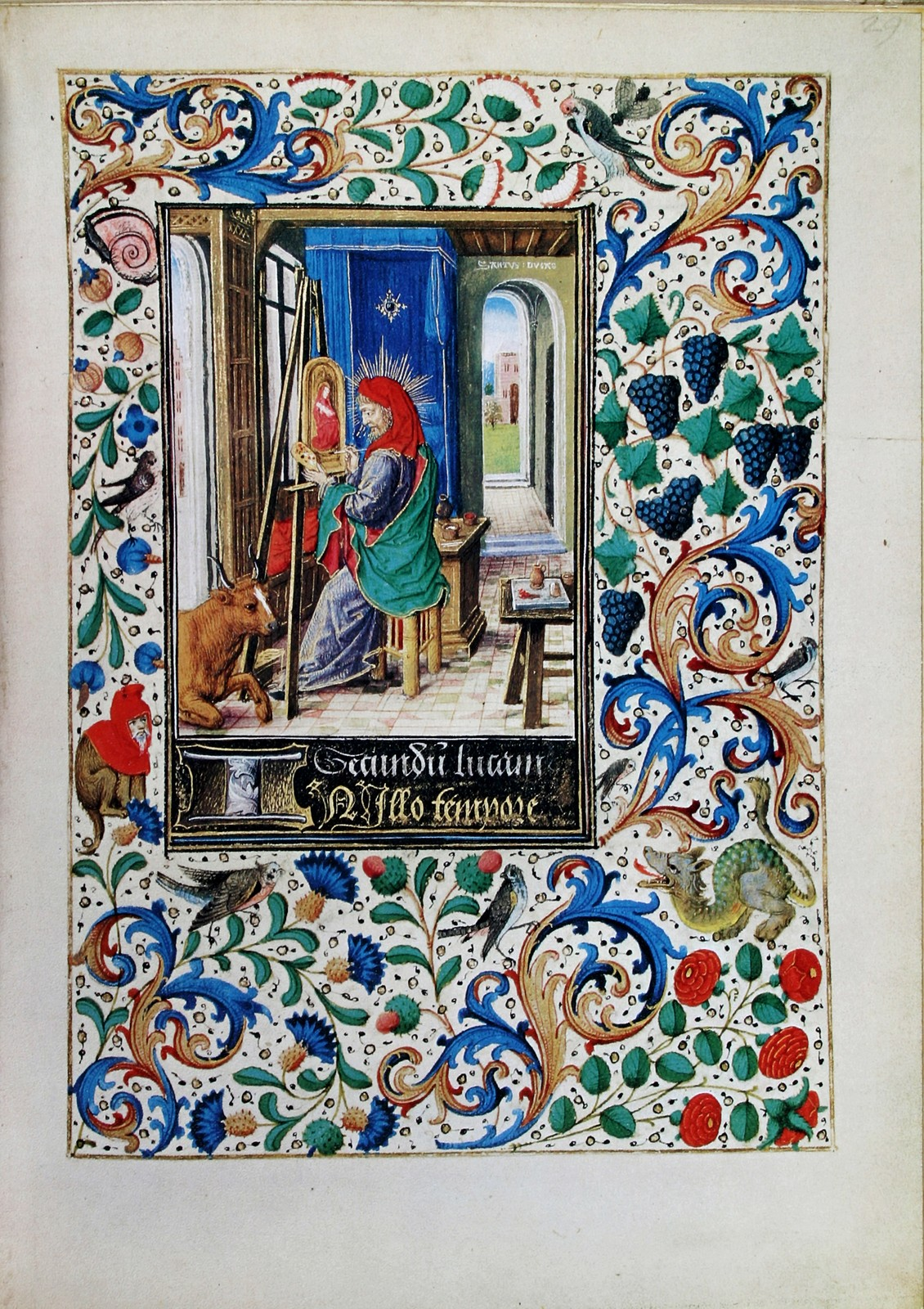
St Luke in The Hours of Mary of Burgundy, c. 1477, Northern Renaissance manuscript illumination.

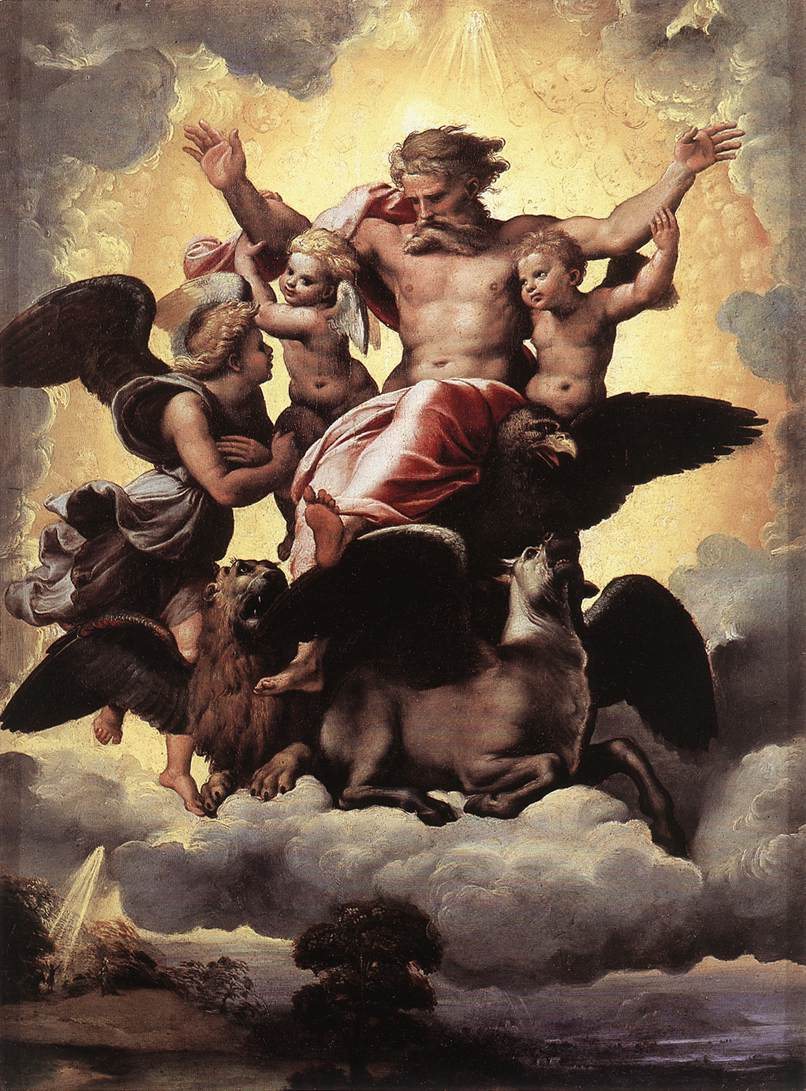
Ezekiel’s Vision by Raphael, c. 1518, Renaissance painting.

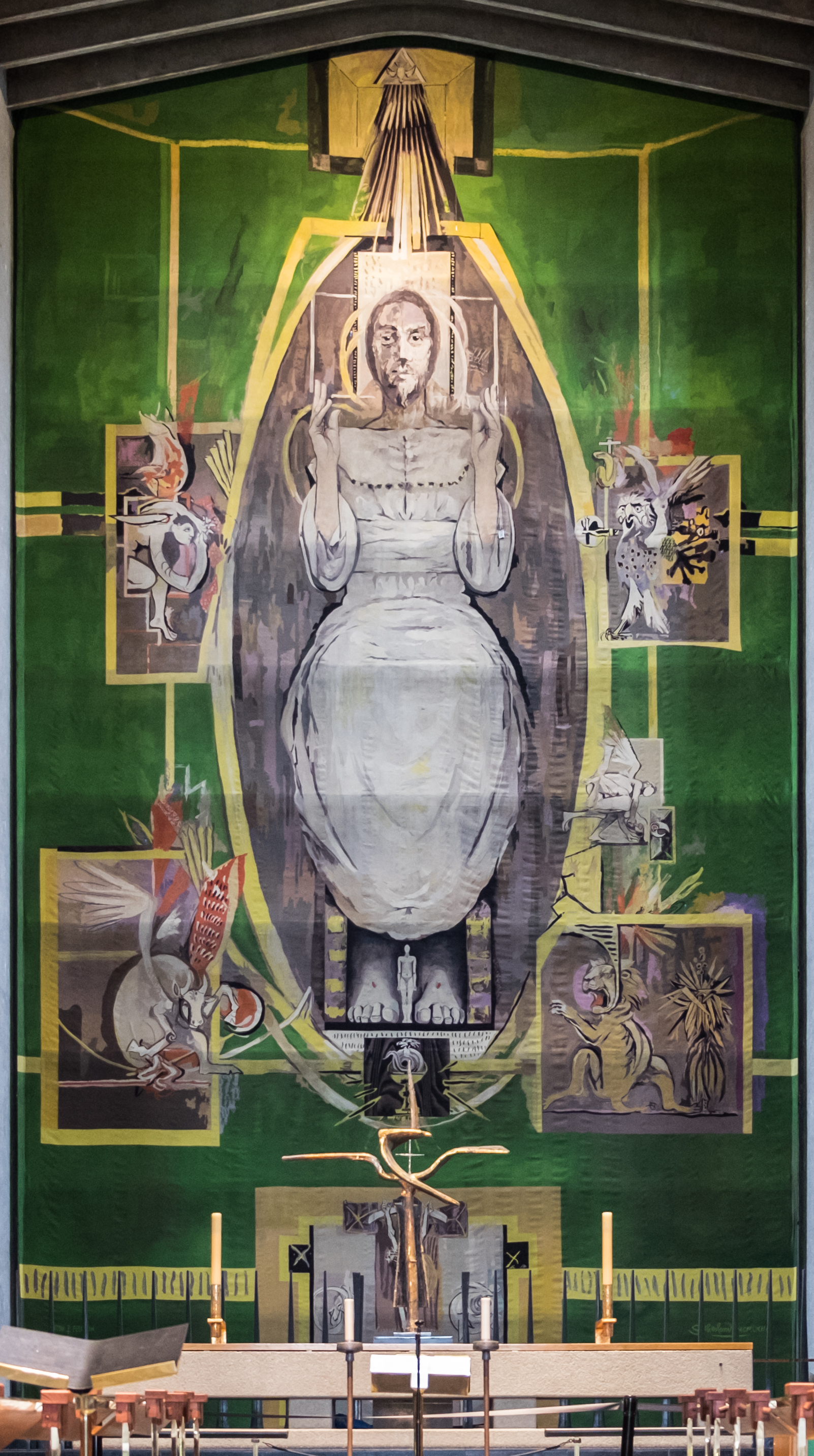
Graham Sutherland's Christ in Glory in the Tetramorph in Coventry Cathedral.

=== Other depictions ===
The tetramorph of the four living creatures is depicted on the World card of many tarot decks, including the Tarot of Marseilles and the Rider-Waite tarot deck. It is also depicted in some Islamic art.

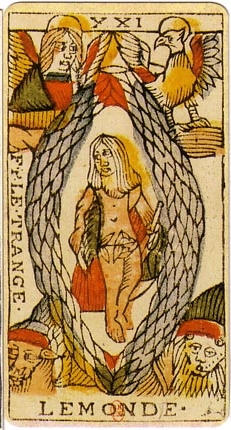
The World card from the Jean Dodal Tarot of Marseille deck (1701–1715)

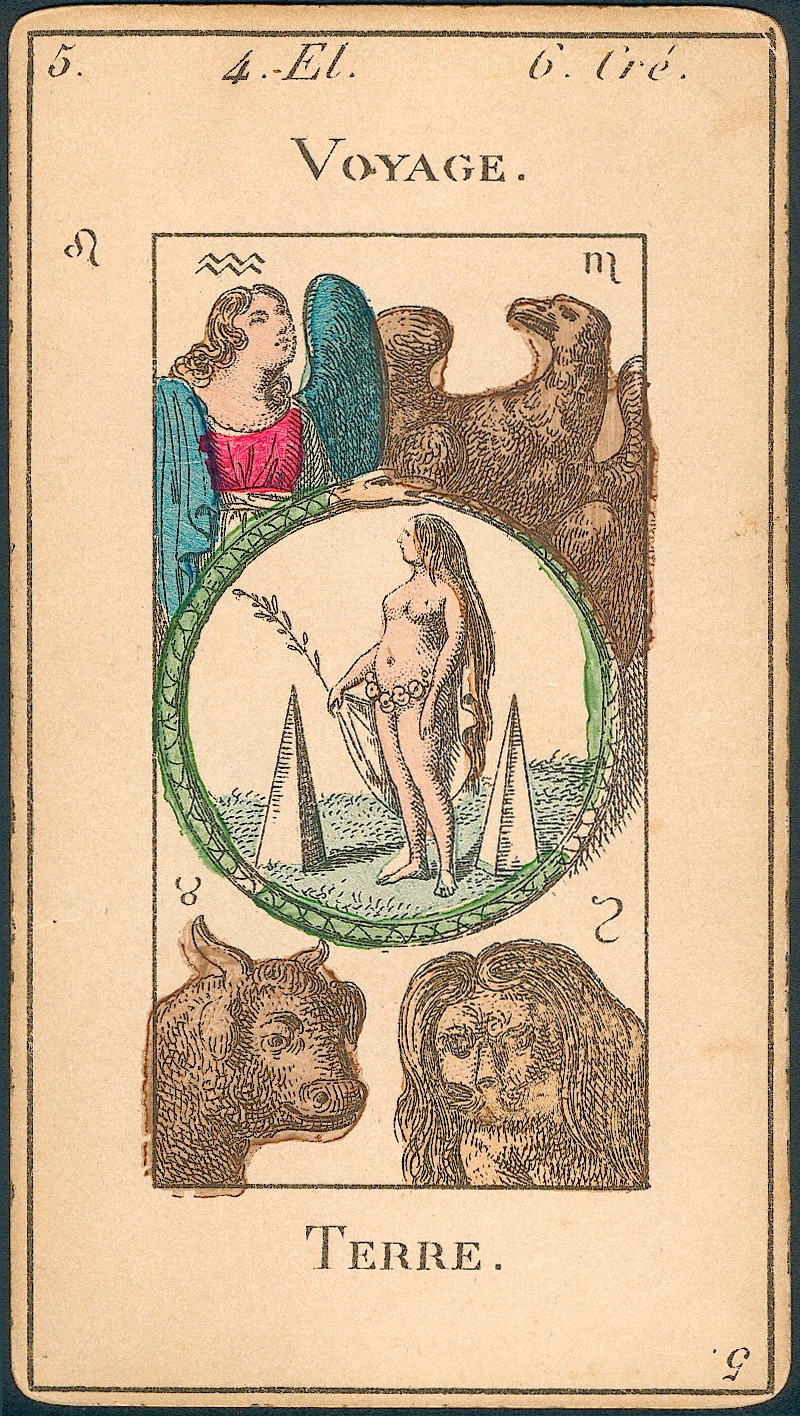
The World card from the Grand Etteilla tarot deck (circa 1890)

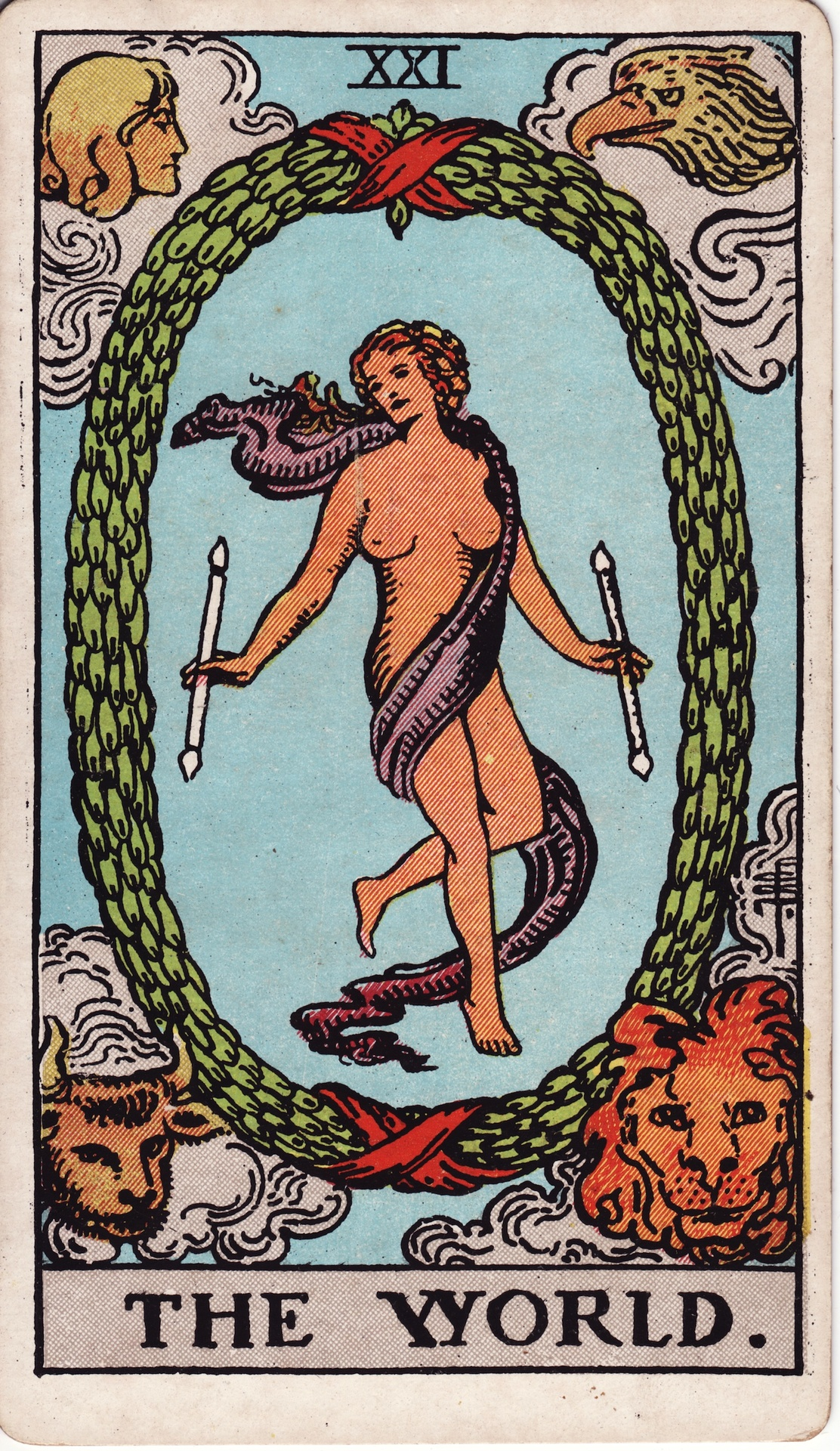
The World card from the Rider-Waite tarot deck (1909)

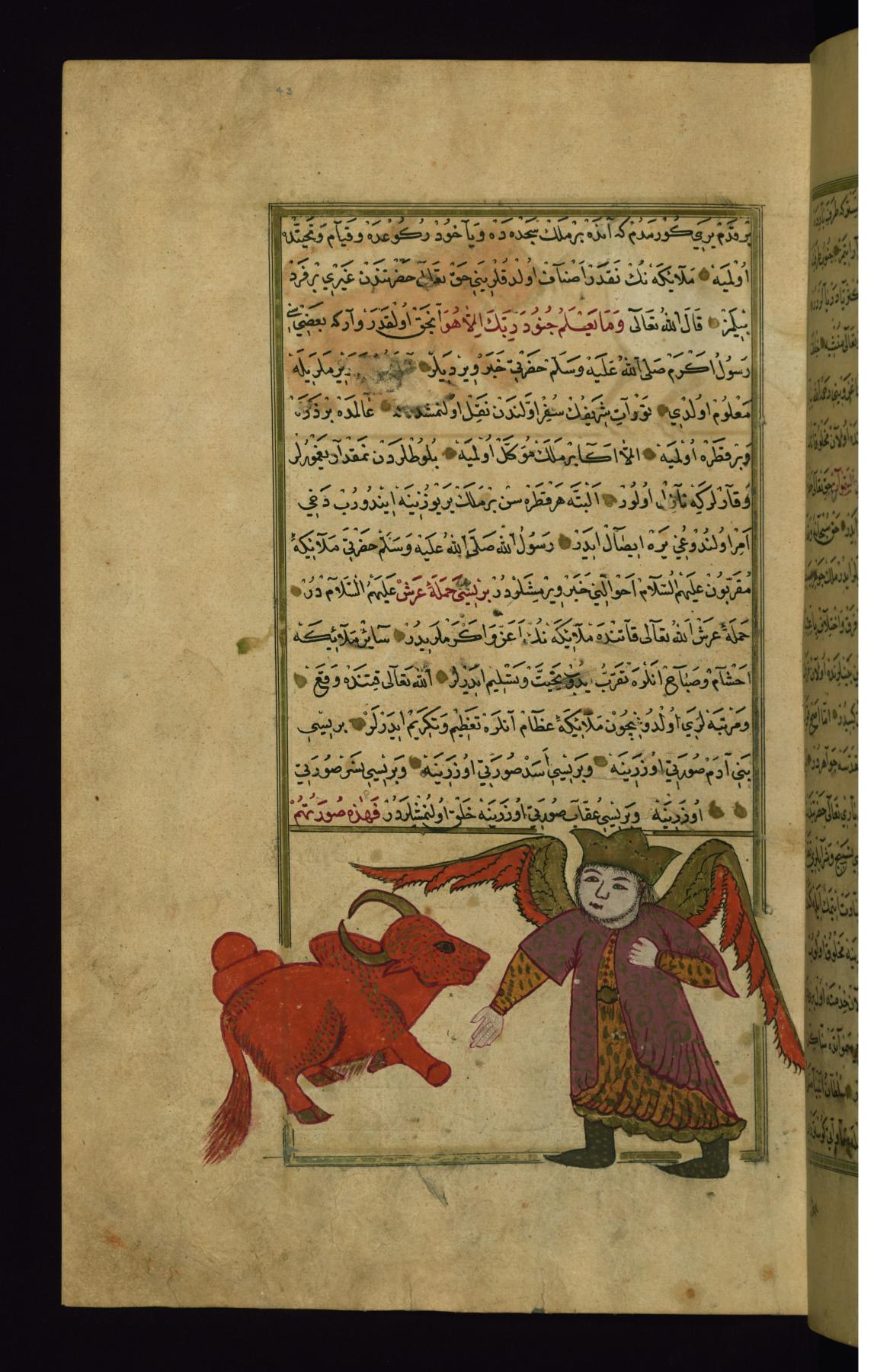
This folio from Walters manuscript W.659 depicts the first 2 of the 4 carriers of the firmament (ox and man).

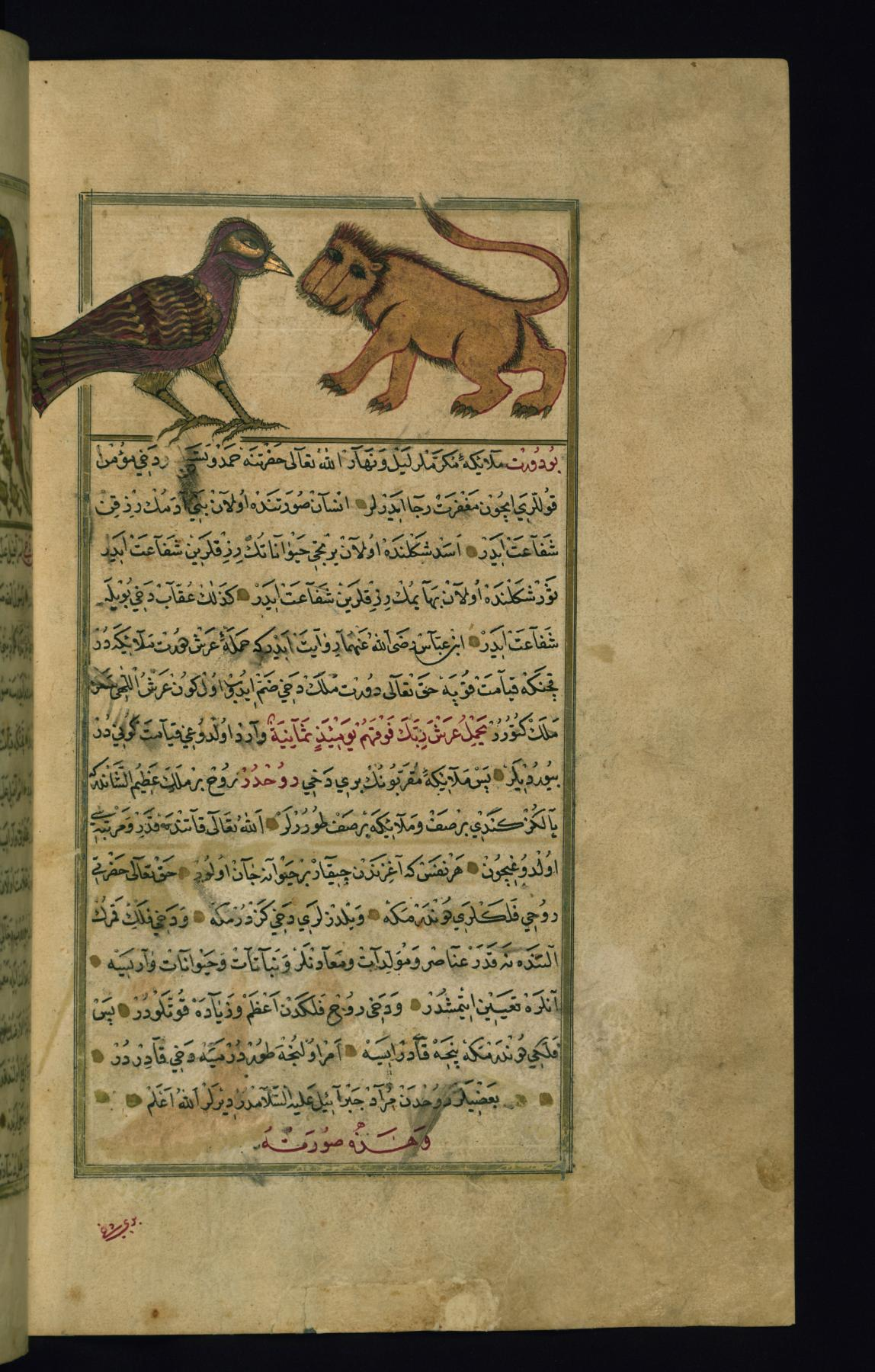
This folio from Walters manuscript W.659 depicts the second 2 carriers of the firmament (lion and vulture).

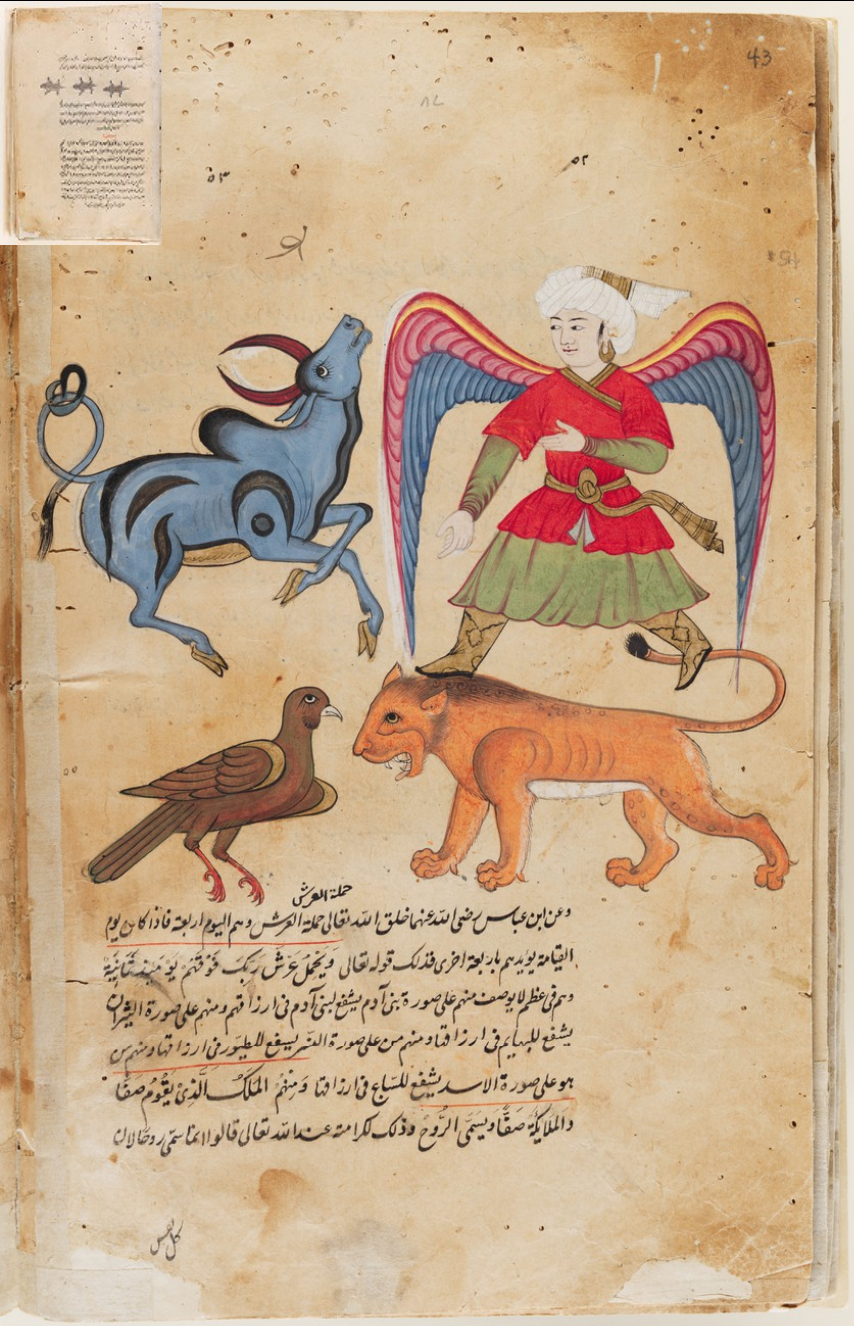
Illustration of angel with lion, ox, and eagle from ʿAjā'ib al-makhlūqāt wa gharā'ib al-mawjūdāt circa 1650

== See also ==
- Animal representation in Western medieval art
- The World (tarot card)
