= Beronicianus =

Several men of late antiquity

Beronicianus (Ancient Greek: Βερονικιανός) is the name of several people of late antiquity.

The name is fairly obscure. It could be a variant name for the (somewhat more common) Berenicianus, but it could also be the male Greek version of the Christian name Veronica that appears in the apocryphal Gospel of Nicodemus.

== Beronicianus of Sardis ==
Beronicianus of Sardis was a philosopher of considerable reputation, who lived until at least the end of the 4th century CE.

Almost everything we know about him comes from the late 4th/early 5th century historian Eunapius, who wrote a biographical sketch of Beronicianus in his work The Lives of Philosophers and Sophists, though his treatment is brief. Of Beronicianus's time we know only that he was alive at the time Eunapius finished writing his book, at the end of the 4th century CE.

== Beronicianus, bishop of Tyre ==
There was also a man named Beronicianus who was bishop of Tyre in the 5th century CE.

He was appointed by Cyril of Alexandria at the Council of Ephesus, in 431 CE, at which he also served as secretary. He asked Cyril to write a letter to the Oriental bishops, urging them to anathematize the controversial prelate Nestorius.

== Flavius Leontius Beronicianus ==
This Beronicianus is mentioned in a 4th or 5th century CE papyrus from Hermopolis as being praeses, or governor, of the Thebaid. The papyrus contains a fairly detailed anecdote of him presiding as judge over a criminal case of robbery with violence.

== Beronicianus, governor of Caria ==
Another Beronicianus was, around the same time as the above, said to have been the praeses of Caria. Nothing further is known of him.
