= Gessius of Petra =

Gessius of Petra (Greek: Γέσιος, Gesios) was an Arab physician, iatrosophist and pagan philosopher active in Alexandria in the late 5th and early 6th century.

== Life ==
Gessius was a native of the region of Petra. According to Damascius, who is the main source for Gessius' biography in the Suda, he was from Petra itself. Stephanus of Byzantium, on the other hand, writes that he came from the agricultural region of el-Ji (today Wadi Musa) not far from Petra. His father's name is unknown. He may have been descended from the Gessius who was a student and correspondent of Libanius and was active in Egypt in the 4th century. He studied under Domnus, who was Jewish. Later, he is said to have lured students away from his master.

According to Zacharias Rhetor, Gessius studied philosophy under Ammonius Hermiae in Alexandria. He was also teaching medicine in Alexandria when Zacharias was living there in the 480s. Damascius says that he began his practice late, but was a famous physician during the reign of the Emperor Zeno (474–491). He reports that he earned "unusual honors from the Romans", perhaps referring to the grant of a title by the Roman state.

Gessius received correspondence from Procopius of Gaza, who was an old friend, and Aeneas of Gaza. Procopius describes Gessius' wife as a barbarian from Phrygia. They had several children. Procopius wrote a letter of consolation on the death of his wife and some of his children. Gessius was also a friend of the Neoplatonist philosopher Heraiscus. He hid him in his house when Zeno was persecuting the Neoplatonists. When Heraiscus died, Gessius gave him an honorable burial.

According to Sophronius of Jerusalem, Gessius received baptism into Christianity under imperial pressure but remained a pagan in secret. Since Zacharias in his Ammonius and Damascius in his Life of Isidore both treat Gessius as nothing other than pagan, this conversion, if it took place, must have happened after the writing of these works. According to Sophronius, Gessius, rising from the baptismal waters, said "this is a bath which takes one's breath away", a mocking paraphrase of a line from the Odyssey and a clear indication of continuing pagan sympathies. He only became a true believer when, after all his skills had failed to cure him from a disease, he prayed to Saints Cyrus and John and was miraculously cured. Edward Watts argues that this story is a literary invention of Sophronius, but Barry Baldwin considers it plausible.

A remark by Stephanus of Athens suggests that Gessius was still practising medicine in Alexandria in the 530s. If the physician of the Petra papyrus fragment P.Petra I 2 is the same Gessius, then he was dead by 10 May 538. In the papyrus, which was drawn up in Gaza, he is described as "of learned memory". In light of his friendship with Procopius and Aeneas, a connection with Gaza is reasonable. If the identification is correct, several papyri have a bearing on Gessius' familial relations.

== Works ==
Gessius wrote a commentary on some medical works of Galen that survives only in a Syriac translation as the undertext in five palimpsest manuscripts. The copy was made in the 9th–10th centuries, but the manuscript was divided up, erased and reused for other works, including the Anonymous Syriac Commentary on the Apocalypse, in the 11th century.
