= Priscus of Epirus =

Roman philosopher

Priscus of Epirus (Greek: Πρίσκος; c. 305 – c. 395 AD), also known as Priscus the Thesprotian (Greek: Πρίσκος ὁ Θεσπρωτὸς) and Priscus the Molossian (Greek: Πρίσκος ὁ Μολοσσός), was a Neoplatonic philosopher and theurgist, a colleague of Maximus of Ephesus, and a friend of the Emperor Julian.

== Biography ==
Priscus was a pupil of Aedesius in Pergamon, and later went to teach in Athens, where he taught Julian. When Julian was in Gaul, he wrote to Priscus in the hope of acquiring the writings of Iamblichus on the Chaldean Oracles. When Julian was proclaimed Caesar he summoned Priscus to Gaul, and he accompanied him to Constantinople when he became Augustus in 361. Priscus and Maximus travelled with Julian on campaign in Persia, and they were with him when he died in 363. Sometime after the death of Julian, Priscus was arrested but eventually freed, avoiding the fate of Maximus who was executed in 371. Priscus returned to Athens where he continued to teach for more than thirty years.

He is portrayed as a prominent character in Gore Vidal's novel Julian (novel), where he appears as personal friend of the emperor-protagonist while still expressing some criticism of the man's spirituality and actions in some instances.
