= Jean-Claude Haelewyck =

Belgian professor of semitics

- Born: 1952
- Education: UCLouvain
- Occupations: University teacher, biblical scholar, Hebraist, writer
- Employers: National Fund for Scientific Research (1982–); UCLouvain (1985–)

Jean-Claude Haelewyck (born in 1952) is a Belgian professor emeritus, semiticist, researcher in the fields of the Old Latin Versions of the Bible and Syriac Studies at Centre d’Études Orientales in Institut Orientaliste de Louvain, Université catholique de Louvain and director of FNRS (Fonds National de la Recherche Scientifique).

== Life ==
Haelewyck studied at the Catholic University of Leuven, where he obtained a master's degree in biblical philology and a master's degree in oriental philology and history. He completed his doctorate in theology in 1984 with the thesis Le texte dit lucianique du livre d'Esther. Sa place parmi les diverses formes et sa logique propre at the Catholic University of Leuven.

=== Teaching ===
He worked at the Centre d'Études Orientales of the Institut Orientaliste de Louvain of the Université catholique de Louvain and was director and researcher at the Nationaal Fonds voor Wetenschappelijk Onderzoek (NFWO). He also was a professor at the Catholic University of Louvain-la-Neuve, president of the Belgian Academy for the Study of Ancient Near Eastern Languages (ABELAO) and editor of the online journal BABELAO.

== Views ==
The contribution by Haelewyck in the Septuagint and Jewish pseudepigrapha, addresses the question of the annihilation of the other and reactions to this narrative element in the Greek tradition of the Book of Esther, in the Septuagint, the so-called "Lucianic" text and the Vetus Latina and its Greek model, by comparison with the story of Esther in the Masoretic Text.

J. C. Haelewyck in 1984, "defended his dissertation on the Lucianic text of the book of Esther", and he affirms that "passages where the AT and the Vetus Latina share the same text are passages where an old Hebrew text of the book of Esther becomes visible." Kristin De Troyer claim: "these passages are, indeed, very important, albeit in my opinion not for the Old Hebrew but rather for the Old Greek text."

== Some works ==
- Haelewyck, J.-C. (1998). Clavis apocryphorvm veteris testamenti. Corpus Christianorum. Turnhout: Brepols. ISBN 2503507026. OCLC 886406882.
- ——————— (2001). Sancti Gregorii Nazianzeni Opera. Versio syriaca. I: Oratio 40. Corpus Christianorum. Corpus Nazianzenum. Vol. 14. Turnhout. p. 221.
- ——————— (2005). Sancti Gregorii Nazianzeni Opera. Versio syriaca. III: Orationes 27, 38–39. Corpus Christianorum. Corpus Nazianzenum. Vol. 18. Turnhout. p. 193.
- ——————— (2006). Grammaire comparée des langues sémitiques: Eléments de phonétique, de morphologie et de syntaxe. Langues et cultures anciennes. Vol. 7. Bruxelles.
- ——————— (2007). Sancti Gregorii Nazianzeni Opera. Versio syriaca. IV: Orationes 28–31. Corpus Christianorum. Corpus Nazianzenum. Vol. 23. Turnhout. p. 407.
- ——————— (2008). Esther. Vetus Latina. Die Reste der altlateinischen Bibel. Vol. 7/3. Freibourg / Breisgau. p. 440.
- ——————— (2011). Sancti Gregorii Nazianzeni Opera. Versio syriaca. V: Orationes 1–3. Corpus Christianorum. Corpus Nazianzenum. Vol. 25. Turnhout. p. 216.
- ——————— (2016). Histoire de Zosime sur la Vie des Bienhgeureux Réchabites. Les versions orientales et leurs manuscrits. CSCO 664. Subsidia 135. Louvain (sous presse).
- ——————— (2018). Evangelium secundum Marcum. Vetus Latina. Die Reste der altlateinischen Bibel. Vol. 17. Freiburg/Breisgau. p. 843.

=== Journals ===
- J.-C. Haelewyck (2006-10-01). "The Relevance of the Old Latin Version for the Septuagint, with Special Emphasis on the Book of Esther". The Journal of Theological Studies. 57 (2): 439–473. doi:10.1093/jts/flj108.
