= Apollinaris of Laodicea =

4th-century Syrian bishop

Apollinaris the Younger, also known as Apollinaris of Laodicea and Apollinarius (Ancient Greek: Ἀπολλινάριος; died 382), was a bishop of Laodicea in Syria. He is best known as a noted opponent of Arianism. Apollinaris's eagerness to emphasize the deity of Jesus and the unity of his person led him to deny the existence of a rational human soul in Christ's human nature. This view came to be called Apollinarism. It was condemned by the First Council of Constantinople in 381.

== Life ==
He collaborated with his father, Apollinaris the Elder, in reproducing the Old Testament in the form of Homeric and Pindaric poetry and the New Testament after the fashion of Platonic dialogues, when the emperor, Julian, had forbidden Christians to teach the classics. He is best known, however, as a noted opponent of Arianism. Apollinaris's eagerness to emphasize the deity of Jesus and the unity of his person led him so far as to deny the existence of a rational human soul (νοῦς, nous) in Christ's human nature, replaced in him by the Logos, and so his body was a glorified and spiritualized form of humanity.

The orthodox position (maintained by Catholicism, Eastern Orthodoxy, the Church of the East, Oriental Orthodoxy, Anglicanism, and most churches within Protestantism) is that God as his Logos assumed human nature in its entirety, including the νοῦς, as only thus could he be humanity's perfect redeemer and prototype. It was alleged that the Apollinarian approach implied docetism: if the Godhead without constraint swayed the manhood, there was no possibility of a real human probation or of a real advance in Christ's manhood. The position was accordingly condemned by several synods, in particular by the First Council of Constantinople, in 381.

That did not prevent it from having a considerable following. After Apollinaris's death, it divided into two sects, the more conservative taking its name (Vitalians) from Vitalis, the Apollinarist claimant to the see of Antioch. The other (Polemeans) added the further assertion that the two natures were so blended that even the body of Christ was a fit object of adoration. The Apollinarian emphasis on the unity of human and divine in Christ and on the divine element in that unity was later restated in the form of Eutychianism and persisted in what was later the radically anti-Nestorian monophysite school.

== Writings ==
Although Apollinaris was a prolific writer, scarcely anything has survived under his own name. However, a number of his writings are concealed under the names of orthodox Fathers, e.g. ἡ κατὰ μέρος πίστις, long ascribed to Gregory Thaumaturgus. They have been collected and edited by Hans Lietzmann.

Two letters of his correspondence with Basil of Caesarea are also extant, but there is scholarly debate regarding their authenticity because they record the orthodox theologian Basil asking Apollinaris for theological advice on the orthodox term homoousios. The concerns may be unfounded, as before Apollinaris began promulgating what were seen as heretical doctrines, he was a highly respected bishop and a friend of Athanasius and Basil.

== Sources ==
- Alessandro Capone, "La polemica apollinarista alla fine del IV secolo: la lettera di Gregorio di Nissa a Teofilo di Alessandria", in Gregory of Nyssa: The Minor Treatises on Trinitarian Theology and Apollinarism. Proceedings of the 11th International Colloquium on Gregory of Nyssa (Tübingen, 17–20 September 2008), ed. By V.H. Drecoll, M. Berghaus, Leiden – Boston 2011, pp. 499–517.
- Edwards, Mark (2009). Catholicity and Heresy in the Early Church. Ashgate. ISBN 978-0-7546-6291-4.
- Alessandro Capone, "Apollinarismo e geografia ecclesiastica" in Auctores nostri 9, 2011, pp. 457–473.
- Christopher Beeley, The Unity of Christ: Continuity and Conflict in Patristic Tradition (Yale, 2012), chapter 4.
