= Apollinaris the Elder =

4th-century Christian writer

Apollinaris the Elder or Apollinarius (Ancient Greek: Ἀπολινάριος), was a Christian grammarian of the 4th century, first in Berytus (now Beirut) in Phoenicia, then in Laodicea in Syria. He was the father of Apollinaris of Laodicea.

== Biography ==
Apollinaris became a priest, and was among the staunchest upholders of the Council of Nicaea (325) and of Athanasius. When the Emperor Julian forbade Christian professors to lecture or comment on the poets or philosophers of Greece in 362, Apollinaris and his son both strove to replace the literary masterpieces of antiquity by new works which should offset the threatened loss to Christians of the advantages of polite instruction and help to win respect for the Christian religion among non-Christians.

According to Socrates of Constantinople (Historia Ecclesiastica, II, xlvi; III, xvi), the elder Apollinaris translated the Pentateuch into Greek hexameters, converted the first two books of Kings into an epic poem of twenty-four cantos, wrote tragedies modelled on Euripides, comedies after the manner of Menander, and odes imitated from Pindar.

Sozomen (Historia Ecclesiastica, V, xviii; VI, xxv) says nothing of the poetical works of the elder Apollinaris, but lays stress on those of his son.

This improvised Greek literature, however, did not survive. As soon as Jovian (363–364) had revoked the edict of Julian the schools returned to the great classic writers, and only the memory of the efforts of Apollinaris survived.
