= Aedesius =

Neoplatonist philosopher (died 355)

Aedesius (Ancient Greek: Αἰδέσιος, died shortly before 355 AD) was a Neoplatonic philosopher and mystic. He was born into a wealthy Cappadocian family, but he moved to Syria, where he was apprenticed to Iamblichus. None of his writings have survived, but there is an extant biography by Eunapius, a Greek sophist and historian of the 4th century who wrote a collection of biographies titled Lives of the Sophists. Aedesius's philosophical doctrine was a mixture between Platonism and eclecticism and, according to Eunapius, he differed from Iamblichus on certain points connected with theurgy and magic.

The school of Syria was dispersed after Iamblichus' death, and Aedesius seems to have modified his doctrines out of fear of Constantine II, and took refuge in divination. An oracle in a dream represented a pastoral life as his only retreat, but his disciples compelled him to resume his instructions. Aedesius then founded a school of philosophy at Pergamon, which emphasized theurgy and the revival of polytheism, and where he numbered among his pupils Eusebius of Myndus, Maximus of Ephesus, and the Roman emperor Julian. After the accession of the latter to the imperial purple, he invited Aedesius to continue his instructions, but the declining strength of the sage being unequal to the task, two of his most learned disciples, Chrysanthius and the aforementioned Eusebius, were by his own desire appointed to supply his place. His co-teacher and perhaps consort at the Pergamon school was the female philosopher and mystic, Sosipatra.

== Bibliography ==
- Hartmann, Udo (2018). Der spätantike Philosoph. Die Lebenswelten der paganen Gelehrten und ihre hagiographische Ausgestaltung in den Philosophenviten von Porphyrios bis Damaskios [The late antique philosopher. The lifeworlds of pagan scholars and their hagiographic treatment in the philosophical vitae from Porphyrius to Damascius]. 3 volumes. Bonn: Habelt, ISBN 978-3-7749-4172-4, pp. 537–558.
