= Chrysanthius =

Greek philosopher

Chrysanthius of Sardis (Ancient Greek: Χρυσάνθιος; died AD 505) was a Greek philosopher who studied at the school of Iamblichus.

He was one of the favorite pupils of Aedesius, and devoted himself mainly to the mystical side of Neoplatonism. The Roman emperor Julian went to him by the advice of Aedesius, and subsequently invited him to come to the court and assist in the projected resuscitation of Hellenism. But Chrysanthius declined, citing the strength of unfavorable omens, though he probably realized the revival was unlikely to bear fruit.

For the same reason he abstained from drastic religious reforms in his capacity as high-priest of Lydia. As a result of his moderation, he remained high-priest until his death, venerated alike by Pagans and Christians. His wife Meite, who was associated with him in the priestly office, was a kinswoman of Eunapius the biographer. Eunapius, who was related to Chrysanthius by marriage, tended to him in his old age and was devoted to him until his death.
