= Oribasius =

Greek medical writer

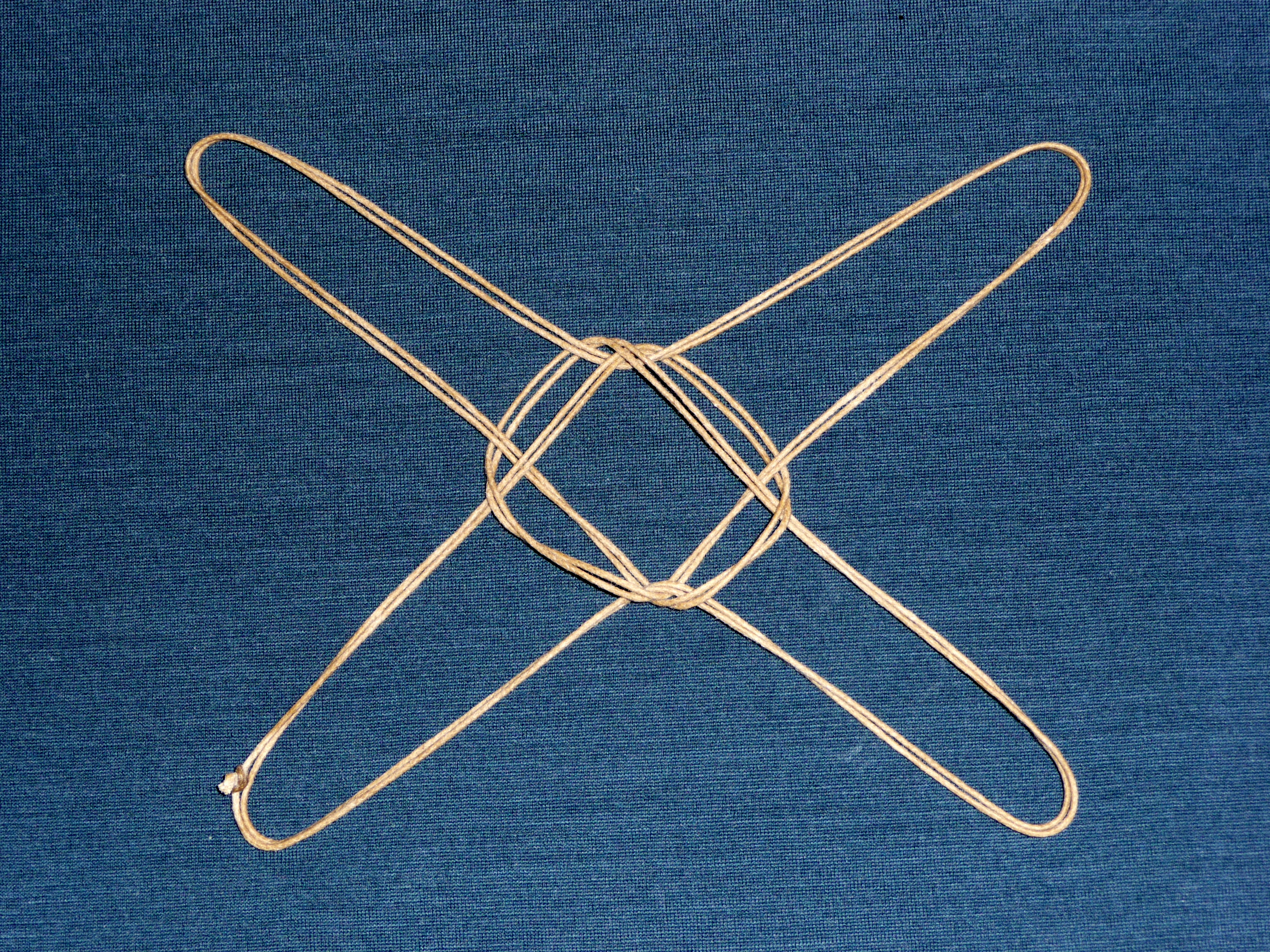
The Plinthios Brokhos as described by Greek physician Heraclas, a sling for the binding of fractured jaws. Heraclas' Knots is quoted at full length in Oribasius' Medical Collections

Oribasius or Oreibasius (Greek: Ὀρειβάσιος or Ὀριβάσιος; c. 320 – 403) was a Greek medical writer and the personal physician of the Roman emperor Julian. He studied at Alexandria under physician Zeno of Cyprus before joining Julian's retinue. He was involved in Julian's coronation in 361, and remained with the emperor until Julian's death in 363. In the wake of this event, Oribasius was banished to foreign courts for a time, but was later recalled by the emperor Valens.

== Works ==
Oribasius's major works, written at the behest of Julian, are two collections of excerpts from the writings of earlier medical scholars, a collection of excerpts from Galen and the Medical Collections (Ἰατρικαὶ Συναγωγαί, Iatrikai Synagogai; Latin: Collectiones medicae), a massive compilation of excerpts from other medical writers of the ancient world. The first of these works is entirely lost, and only 25 of the 70 (or 72) books of the Collectiones survive. This work preserves a number of excerpts from older writers whose writings have otherwise been lost, and has thus been valuable to modern scholars. The earliest known description of a string figure, presented as the surgical sling Plinthios Brokhos by Greek physician Heraklas, is among the preserved material.

Hagiography has it that in 362, on behalf of his emperor Julian, Oribasius visited the Delphic oracle, now in a rather desolate state, offering his emperor's services to the temple and, in return, receiving one of the last prophecies by the Delphic Pythia:

Εἴπατε τῷ βασιλεῖ, χαμαὶ πέσε δαίδαλος αὐλά,
οὐκέτι Φοῖβος ἔχει καλύβην, οὐ μάντιδα δάφνην,
οὐ παγὰν λαλέουσαν, ἀπέσβετο καὶ λάλον ὕδωρ.

Tell the king, the splendid hall fell to the ground.
Phoebus no longer has his house, nor the prophesying laurel,
nor the speaking well. The speaking water has dried out.
— Passio Artemii 96.1284.45–7, Cedrenus 1.532.8–10
