= Libanius =

Greek rhetorician (4th century AD)

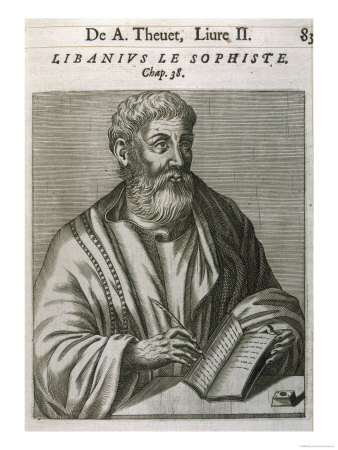
- Libanius as imagined in an eighteenth-century woodcut
- Born: c. 314 AD; Antioch, Coele-Syria
- Died: 392 or 393 AD; Antioch, Coele-Syria
- Occupation: Teacher of rhetoric
- Notable work: Oration I, A Reply To Aristides On Behalf Of The Dancers, Lamentation

Libanius (Ancient Greek: Λιβάνιος, romanized: Libanios; c. 314–392 or 393) was a teacher of rhetoric of the Sophist school in the Eastern Roman Empire. His prolific writings make him one of the best documented teachers of higher education in the ancient world and a critical source of history of the Greek East during the 4th century AD. During the rise of Christian hegemony in the later Roman Empire, he remained unconverted and in religious matters was a pagan Hellene.

== Life ==
=== Origin ===
Libanius was born in Antioch, Coele-Syria located near the modern-day city of Antakya, Turkey. He was born into a deeply cultured and once-influential family that had experienced substantial recent decline. In 303 AD, eleven years before his birth, his family had participated in resisting an insurrection by a local army garrison, led by a certain Eugenius. In the end, Roman Imperial authorities were equally concerned by local aristocrats arming themselves as they were by the rebellious troops. Libanius' family fell out of favor and his grandfather was executed. Libanius' father died when he was eleven, leaving his upbringing to his mother and maternal uncles, who were in the process of rebuilding his family's reputation.

At fourteen years old he began his study of rhetoric, for which he withdrew from public life and devoted himself to philosophy. Unfamiliar with Latin literature, he deplored its influence.

=== Career ===
He studied in Athens under Diophantus the Arab and began his career in Constantinople as a private tutor. He was exiled to Nicomedia in 346 (or earlier) for around five years but returned to Constantinople and taught there until 354. At this time, he held an official appointment as a sophist in the capital and received an imperial salary. Libanius was a friend of the emperor Julian, with whom some correspondence survives, and in whose memory he wrote a series of orations; they were composed between 362 and 379. In winter 353/54 he returned to Antioch in expectation of succeeding his former teacher Zenobius, but the latter refused to yield his place and Libanius could only take the position upon Zenobius' illness and following death in autumn 354. His pupils included both pagans and Christians. There, he continued to receive an imperial salary, which was cut for a period of time, which resulted in Libanius in writing many letters trying to obtain it back. (Note: Though some modern accounts insinuate that the salary was cut by the Christian praefect Helpidius because Libanius was a pagan, relations between the two were not uniformly hostile and there is no evidence that the hostility was inspired by religious differences.)

Libanius used his arts of rhetoric to advance various private and political causes. He attacked the increasing imperial pressures on the traditional city-oriented culture that had been supported and dominated by the local upper classes. Nevertheless, though Libanius liked to assume the role of an honourable, independent citizen, he concerned himself often with winning for himself and his friends honours and privileges bestowed by the central imperial authority. He is known to have protested against the persecution of pagans in the late Roman Empire. In 386, he appealed without success to emperor Theodosius to prevent the destruction of a temple in Edessa, and pleaded for toleration and the preservation of the temples against the predation of Christian monks, who he claimed:

[...]hasten to attack the temples with sticks and stones and bars of iron, and in some cases, disdaining these, with hands and feet. Then utter desolation follows, with the stripping of roofs, demolition of walls, the tearing down of statues and the overthrow of altars, and the priests must either keep quiet or die. After demolishing one, they scurry to another, and to a third, and trophy is piled on trophy, in contravention of the law. Such outrages occur even in the cities, but they are most common in the countryside. Many are the foes who perpetrate the separate attacks, but after their countless crimes this scattered rabble congregates and they are in disgrace unless they have committed the foulest outrage...Temples, Sire, are the soul of the countryside: they mark the beginning of its settlement, and have been passed down through many generations to the men of today. In them the farming communities rest their hopes for husbands, wives, children, for their oxen and the soil they sow and plant. An estate that has suffered so has lost the inspiration of the peasantry together with their hopes, for they believe that their labour will be in vain once they are robbed of the gods who direct their labours to their due end. And if the land no longer enjoys the same care, neither can the yield match what it was before, and, if this be the case, the peasant is the poorer, and the revenue jeopardized.

— Libanius, Pro Templis

The surviving works of Libanius, which include over 1,600 letters, 64 speeches and 96 progymnasmata (rhetorical exercises), are valuable as a historical source for the changing world of the later 4th century. His oration "A Reply To Aristides On Behalf Of The Dancers" is one of the most important records of Roman concert dance, particularly that immensely popular form known as pantomime. His first Oration I is an autobiographical narrative, first written in 374 and revised throughout his life, a scholar's account that ends as an old exile's private journal. Progymnasma 8 (see above for explanation of a "progymnasma") is an imaginary summation of the prosecution's case against a physician charged with poisoning some of his patients.

Although Libanius was not a Christian his students included such notable Christians as John Chrysostom and Theodore of Mopsuestia. Despite his friendship with the pagan restorationist Emperor Julian he was made an honorary praetorian prefect by the Christian Emperor Theodosius I.

== Works ==
- 64 orations in the three fields of oratory: judicial, deliberative and epideictic, both orations as if delivered in public and orations meant to be privately read (aloud) in the study. The two volumes of selections in the Loeb Classical Library devote one volume to Libanius' orations that bear on the emperor Julian, the other on Theodosius; the most famous is his "Lamentation" about the desecration of the temples (Or. XXX: Περὶ τῶν Ἱερῶν or Pro templis);
- 51 declamationes, a traditional public-speaking format of Rhetoric in Antiquity, taking set topics with historical and mythological themes (translations into English by e.g. D.A. Russell), "Libanius: Imaginary Speeches"; M. Johansson, "Libanius' Declamations 9 and 10";
- 96 progymnasmata or compositional exercises for students of rhetoric, used in his courses of instruction and widely admired as models of good style;
- 57 hypotheses or introductions to Demosthenes' orations (written c. 352), in which he sets them in historical context for the novice reader, without polemics;
- 1545 letters have been preserved, more letters than those of Cicero. Some 400 additional letters in Latin were later accepted, purporting to be translations, but a dispassionate examination of the texts themselves shows them to be misattributed or forgeries, by the Italian humanist Francesco Zambeccari in the 15th century. Among his correspondents there was Censorius Datianus.
- Libanius (1903). Epistulae. Opera. Translated by Richard Foerster. Lipsiae In aedibus B.G. Teubneri.

== English editions ==
- Scott Bradbury, Selected Letters of Libanius (= Translated Texts for Historians. Vol. 41). Liverpool, University Press, 2004. ISBN 0-85323-509-0
- Scott Bradbury, David Moncur (editors): Letters of Libanius from the age of Theodosius (= Translated Texts for Historians. Vol. 82). Liverpool University Press, Liverpool 2023. ISBN 978-1-80207-683-7
- Raffaella Cribiore, The School of Libanius in Late Antique Antioch. Princeton: Princeton University Press, 2007. (Includes translation of c. 200 letters dealing with the school and its students. Reviewed in Bryn Mawr Classical Reviews.)
- Margaret E. Molloy: Libanius and the Dancers, Olms-Weidmann, Hildesheim 1996 ISBN 3-487-10220-X
- A.F. Norman, Libanius: Selected Works, 2 volumes. Cambridge, Massachusetts: Loeb Classical Library, 1969–1977.
- Norman, A.F. "1994.02.05, Norman (ed.), Libanius – Bryn Mawr Classical Review". Bryn Mawr Classical Review.
