= Chaldean Hekate =

Chaldean Herkate, a goddess described in the Chaldean Oracles

Hekate (also spelled Hecate; Latinate form: /ˈhɛkəti/ HEK-ə-tee; Ancient Greek: Ἑκάτη; in Greek meaning "Far Away"; classical pronunciation: [/hɛˈkɑːteɪ/ hey-KAH-tay]), as presented in the corpus of ancient sacred texts and text fragments together collected under the English title of The Chaldean Oracles or The Chaldean Oracles of Zoroaster, is a goddess worshipped in a theurgical mystico-magical tradition based in the Chaldean Oracles, which flourished from approximately 150 to 500 CE. In this theurgical tradition, she plays a major cosmological, cosmogonic, salvific, ritual, and devotional role.

For many current scholars, the goddess exhibits a distinctly different divine status and mode of activity from the indigenous Greek goddess of the same name, who was associated with the underworld, magicians, and ghosts. In his seminal work on Chaldean theurgy, Hans Lewy distinguishes the Chaldean Hekate from the indigenous Greek goddess, Hecate, the latter whom he describes as being “of the magicians”:

[T]he Chaldaean Hecate is not, like that of the magicians, a 'chthonic divinity', but a supercelestial goddess and is for this reason said to "descend" at her epiphany...

The Chaldean Hekate is instrumental in the theurgical and philosophical praxis of material and spiritual purification rituals that the Chaldean and, later, Neoplatonic theurgists performed to prepare for union with the Transcendent One. She is a soteriological goddess, aiding adherents to rescue their souls from imprisonment in materiality and to protect their souls from demonic states or possession during and after life.

Until the late 20th century, scholars identified Chaldean Hekate with the World Soul (also known as the Cosmic Soul) from Plato’s cosmogonic dialog, Timaeus and Nature. This apparent consensus was challenged by Dillon in 1990 and Ronan in 1992, and later by Brisson and van den Berg. Based on this further research, Hekate’s ontological status was updated to be a primary entity within the Chaldean Trinity, equal in status to the creative First Intellect and the Second Intellect, the Demiurge of Chaldean cosmology.

== Overview ==
Chaldean Hekate as a divine being appears prominently in the Chaldean Oracles. These oracles have come down to us from antiquity as a collection of fragments. Originating in the mid 2nd c. CE, they are believed to have been communicated by the gods to and compiled by Julian the Theurgist

The current collection of oracle fragments are culled from the writings of various Neoplatonic theurgists, including Proclus, Damascius, and Synesius. Why full manuscripts of the texts no longer exist remains a matter of speculation, perhaps lost through neglect or possibly as part of the Christian ban on pagan writings.

The fragments that we possess provide a partial picture of what must have been a formidable cosmogony and cosmology. Even in their fragmented state, the oracles present philosophical ideas in mythic form, ostensibly based on Plato's philosophy, specifically his Timaeus, Republic, Phaedrus, Symposium, and Parmenides dialogs. Brisson and others also note the presence of other philosophical elements in the work, including Numenius of Apamea's Middle Platonism. There may be aspects of proto-gnosticism, as well, and the Chaldean cosmology may have influenced later Gnostic writings.

The Oracles were significant enough for the Neoplatonic Theurgists that the main proponents of the school — Porphyry, Iamblichus, Proclus, and Damascius — wrote large commentaries on them. All of these commentaries are lost - either through the vagaries of history or, again, purges of pagan culture carried out by Christians. To give an idea of how large the Oracles could have been, one need only think of the reputed two hefty volumes of commentary Iamblichus is said to have produced.

== Hekate in the Chaldean Oracles ==
Based on her presence in the Chaldean Oracles, numerous scholars use the term, Chaldean Hekate, to identify her prominence in the work and to distinguish her from the classical goddess of Greek myth. Quantitatively, Chaldean Oracle fragments that mention Chaldean Hekate either directly or indirectly number about 33, around 15 percent of the total fragments. Lewy mentions several others that are not accepted by other scholars. Ronan also mentions and quotes others, which are not contained in the standard Majercik/Des Places text.

Until the 1990s, the scholarly consensus was that Chaldean Hekate is the same as - but elaborated in more philosophical terms - the traditional Greek chthonic goddess. This consensus argued that Hekate in the Chaldean Oracles exhibits the features of Plato’s World Soul, as known from his cosmogonic dialog, Timaeus.

However, Dillon and Ronan and later Brisson questioned this conception of the goddess. A new consensus formed which views the Chaldean Hekate as a member of the super-celestial trinity emanating from the divine Good, which transcends all thought and Being.

The next section describes this evolution of the Chaldean Hekate.

== Evolution of a Goddess? ==
Arguing for Chaldean Hekate’s syncretistic identification with the traditional Greek goddess, Lewy and Johnston equate her with the Platonic World Soul. Lewy arrives at the conclusion based on his reading of Proclus and Psellos. In this analysis, Chaldean Hekate is the “membrane” that separates the material world from the spiritual world. Johnston follows Lewy in this analysis.

However, scholars continued to note how Chaldean Hekate exhibits significant differences from the traditional Greek goddess. The indigenous goddess, Hekate, was a chthonic entity closely associated with the underworld, ghosts, and she escorted souls to Tartarus. In this role she was aligned with Demeter and Persephone.

Among many epithets, she was known as goddess of the threshold [Gk: enodia], which recognizes her control of the liminal space between the earthly world and the transitional state after death. However, in the Oracles, Chaldean Hekate doesn’t associate with the underworld, but instead the world above the earthly.

Why did the Chaldean theurgists decide to worship an already existing goddess from Greek mythology and transfer to her a unique, different role in terms of spiritual, philosophical, and ritual meaning? Or did they?

=== Goddess of the Theurgists ===
In her earlier work, Johnston saw Hekate as an evolution of the indigenous understanding of the chthonic goddess. In this evolved form, the Chaldean theurgists found a goddess who met their need for a divine entity who could support their theurgic-philosophical praxis and provide passage to the world above the terrestrial and lunar realms. Johnston writes:

If Hecate was to aid the theurgist, she must control these celestial mediators rather than the chthonic ones, opening not the gate to Hades but the gate to the divine realm. … [I]n popular thought and literature, she became ever more horrific; this was in part due to the increasingly horrific and threatening character of the daimones she led. In theory and philosophy, however, as celestial mediators and mediation became ever more important to man’s spiritual self-improvement and salvation, Hecate became increasingly beneficent, ever more the savior. By the time of Proclus, it was possible to portray her as the goddess who protected men from sickness, who led the human soul upwards after cleansing it in mysteries and showing it the "divine path," and who brought the worshiper to "safe anchorage in the harbor of devotion."

In Johnston’s analysis, Chaldean Hekate is a savior figure, capable of leading the soul from the material world to oneness with the highest realm of reality, the Primordial Fire. As World Soul she stands at the interface of the material and spiritual worlds and can therefore meet the soul after death or during mystical ecstasy and guide it from the material world to the world above. For the philosophical theurgists she represented transition, transformation, and the commerce with lunar and sublunar worlds.

Beginning in 1990, studies by Dillon, Ronan and, later, Brisson, undercut the Chaldean Hekate’s identification with the World Soul. In their various studies, the goddess acquires a more celestial, superlunary, role in cosmology, cosmogony, and metaphysics. In answer to why the Chaldean therapists chose Hekate for their theurgic praxis, Dillon (somewhat wryly) concludes:

[H]er role in magical ritual was significant in this connexion, since the Oracles are, after all, a handbook of theurgy, and Hecate, as a chthonic deity, is easier to summon up than Athene might be.

=== Mother Goddess? ===
Another way of looking at why the theurgists chose Hekate was voiced by GRS Meade at the start of the 20th c.:

Hecat‘ seems to have been the best equivalent our Greek mystics [the Chaldeans] could find in the Hellenic pantheon for the mysterious and awe-inspiring Primal Mother or Great Mother of Oriental mystagogy.

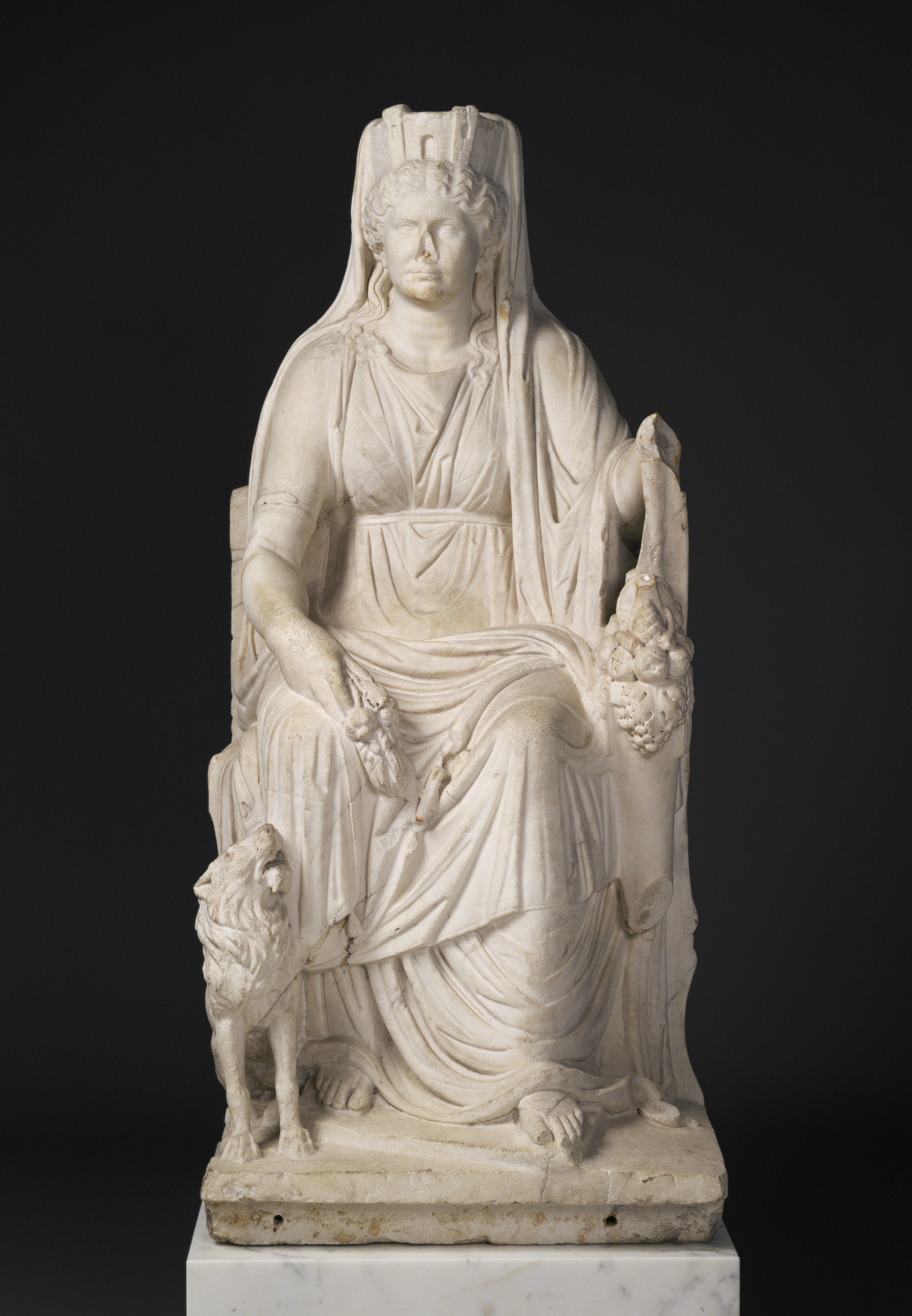
Cybele enthroned, with lion, cornucopia, and mural crown. Roman marble, c. 50 AD. Getty Museum

Mead’s comment aligns with Iamblichus’ apparent enthusiasm for Cybele, the Mother Goddess par excellence. Van den Berg comes close to echoing Mead’s argument. Following Proclus’s thought in the Timaeus and Cratylus commentaries, he shows how Proclus links Hekate with the goddesses Rhea, Hera, Demeter and Persephone in their regenerative roles in the Eleusinian Mysteries. He notes that the theurgist Roman emperor Julian wrote a hymn to the great Mother Goddess, which has significant parallels with Chaldean theurgy and the Chaldean Hekate.

Along with Dillon in the 1990s, Ronan recognized Hekate’s unique status in the Chaldean divine Trinity. His understanding of Hekate is most emphatic on the complete separation between the Chaldean Hekate and the goddess of myth. The latter he calls the Greco-Roman Hekate. He thinks that the Chaldean Hekate represents “a return to Hekate's Great Goddess origins.” In this regard, her origins would be related to the goddess Cybele, celebrated by Iamblichus and the emperor Julian.

== Hekate in the Chaldean Cosmology ==
The picture of Hekate presented in the Chaldean Oracles is as a powerful emanation of the godhead, the embodiment of the life-giving, intellectual, creative, and magical power of the Transcendent reality. As noted above, her specific role in the Chaldean Oracles was as a guide to the infinite and Transcendent realm.

In 1990, Dillon published a philosophical analysis of feminine deities in Middle and later Platonism. Drawing parallels with the figure of Sophia in Philo and Gnosticism, Dillon argues that the Chaldean Hekate is part of the highest Chaldean Trinity, along with the creative Intellect and the second, demiurgic Intellect. This places her above the sublunary realm which Lewy and Johnston propose and instead catapults her to the divine godhead itself.

Dillon writes:

Hecate is thus the median element in a triad, fulfilling the same role, that of dynamis, that the highest female principle performs. … Hecate takes on some of the character of the Hagion Pneuma, the Second Person of the Christian Trinity.

Two years later, Ronan advocates a similar position. A decade after these two scholars, Brisson elaborates on the conclusion that Chaldean Hekate is part of the Chaldean Trinity. Other scholars followed suit: Seng, Turner, Finamore and Johnston, and van den Berg, among others.

=== The Chaldean Trinity ===
In Chaldean thought, a holy trinity emanates from an unknowable, unsayable Transcendent Fire, which is equivalent to the Neoplatonic Good. In recognizing Chaldean Hekate’s place and role in this trinity, the oracles identify her as Power (dynamis).

As Power, Hekate is a mediating principle. She “is borne” between the First Intellect and Second Intellect, or Demiurge. She embodies “the Power of the Father,” the first Intellect. From the First Intellect, she receives the source of soul that is transmitted as lightning and fire into her womb. From there the second Intellect, the Demiurge, fashions human and universal souls.

As Power, Chaldean Hekate is the life-giving and -sustaining strength (ἀλκή) that is diffused throughout the universe. This strength is what gives life its ability to survive and provides the soul’s impetus to re-merge with the One. It is the power that binds the theurgist’s soul to the divine and motivates it above in anagogic ascent after it has descended into matter. It is the internal power which the theurgic adepts make use of to move through the realms of the divine, after they purify themselves, in anagogic ascent.

Hekate is aligned with the supreme life-force in the universe that brings energy and life to spiritual and material creation. In her and through her all things in the universe are intimately connected. According to the Neoplatonic Theurgist, Proclus:

For we have intellect in act, and a rational soul that came forth from the same father and the same life-producing goddess as that of the universe

As the cosmic womb, she is the fount of primeval life in the universe and source of transcendent ethics. As mediator between the First Intellect (Father) and Second Intellect (Demiurge), she is the conduit through which the Ideas radiate and impregnate the material world, and convey meaning, making thought, sensation, and consciousness possible. In her position between the First and third emanation of the One, Hekate fulfills several purposes, perhaps most importantly curbing the mingling (Gk: mighnai) of the intelligible and material fires that comprise the celestial and material realms of existence. These must remain unmixed as part of the universal drama of salvation that the human soul unfolds.

Turner summarizes Hekate’s cosmological role:

First she functions on the highest level as the Father’s emanative power, playing a role similar to that of Plotinus’s intelligible matter or “trace” of unbounded Life emitted from the One to become bounded Intellect (Enn. 6.7 [38].17). Second, in her capacity as the cosmic “womb” and source of soul and multiplicity, she serves as both the “center” or “membrane” separating the two Fathers (or “fires,” frgs. 6, 50) and the “bond” of the measuring triad that conjoins them. Third, on a still lower level, she is conceived both as the womb of the world within which all things are sown and contained (frg. 32, καὶ τὸν ζῳογόνον πληροῦσ΄ Ἑκάτης κόλπον; 28, 30) that receives the Father’s intelligible fire used by the demiurge to fabricate all souls and sensible realities (frg. 34; cf. 90, 96), and also as the krater or mixing bowl (frgs. 28, 30, 32) in which the demiurge mixes the ingredients of all souls (cf. Tim. 34b3–8) and introduces them into the world. Thus Hecate is not the World Cosmic Soul, but its source.

=== Not Just a Womb ===
The Chaldean Oracle fragments can produce an impression of Chaldean Hekate as a very passive, “dumb” receptacle for the intellective lightings and impetus from the more active First Intellect. Ronan, however, highlights the goddess’ role as universal Power in a more active sense. For him, Hekate is an intelligent agent guiding the leaders of the world. He quotes Michael Italicus:

It is as some sort of an Ineffable Power that they [the Chaldeans] hymn Hekate as Goddess of all the Leaders of Worlds, and they fancifully imagine that she filled all things with Intellective light.

According to the Neoplatonic theurgist Proclus, Chaldean Hekate is the “many-named mother of the gods,” which is also an epithet of Rhea. Van den Berg elaborates Proclus’s thought, which explores what it means for the Chaldeans and Proclus to equate Hekate with the mother of the gods. Van den Berg concludes that Hekate-Rhea gives birth to the Eleusinian gods, Demeter, Hera, and Persephone, etc. By way of these actions, she is involved in the Eleusinian rite of initiation whereby the worshipper is killed and then resurrected to higher self-awareness. This rite serves as the basis then for the theurgic ritual of purification and ascent to the Transcendent One.

Therefore, in his analysis of Proclus’ Cratylus commentary and Platonic Theology, van den Berg clearly shows that for the Chaldean Oracles and for Proclus, Chaldean Hekate is equivalent to Rhea. As a consequence, he writes, Rhea - and by extension Hekate - is the main protagonist of the emperor Julian’s Hymn to the Great Goddess, also known as Cybele. In this hymn, Julian goes to great lengths to show the all-comprehensive nature of the Great Goddess’s control of life (Hekate-Rhea, Cybele):

Who then is the mother of the gods? She is the source of the intellectual and creative gods, who in their turn guide visible gods: she is both the mother and the spouse of mighty Zeus; she came into being next to and together with the great creator; she is in control of every form of life, and the cause of all generation; she easily brings to perfection all things that are made; without pain she brings to birth, and with the father's aid creates all things that are; she is the motherless maiden, enthroned at the side of Zeus, and in very truth is the mother of all the gods.

Following on Michael Italicus, we can say that she bestows upon all thing “intellective light”. This echoes the Chaldean Oracles in fragment 56, where she “is the source and stream of blessed intellectual (realities).”

== Salvific Aspects ==
For the Chaldeans, as was also true of the Neoplatonists, the human soul is a precious entitity that is born in the celestial realms but then falls into the material world. In falling, the soul forgets its true origins, which deprives it of knowledge of its self as well as the world beyond. The main action of theurgical praxis is to save the soul from the prison of matter and ascend back to its origins in the upper realms.

Lewy and Johnston investigate the soteriological aspects of Hekate’s role in the Chaldean Oracles. For both, Hekate represents the goddess of the crossroads, Enodia, who meets souls at crucial moments in their lives and attempts to guide them from error to truth. For the theurgists, she makes use of her access to the magical sympathy that permeates the universe to help them invoke the assistance of daemons in their purification rites and ascent to union with the One.

As a spiritual warrior goddess, she helps the theurgist in their ascent by protecting against the demons that threaten their progress and their soul’s integrity. She defends the theurgist as they make their anagogic ascent towards the One.

Lewy quotes Proclus’s hymn to Hekate to emphasize this salvific action:

Teach me, in my longing path which God has made known. I would behold the venerable light from whence it is possible to escape the dark evil of birth. Reach forth, I pray, your hands and bear me, who am weary, upon your wings to the harbour of piety.

Johnston concurs with Lewy, providing details of theurgic ritual and metaphysical operation. She writes:

The mediating Iynx-daemones, that traveled between the celestial and terrestrial realms, sprang from and were under the control of Hekate/Soul. The corresponding iynx-top, whose whirling and sounds represented and strengthened the cosmic sympathy upon which the theurgist depended, was dedicated to Hekate. As mistress of these Iynges, Hekate/Soul helped the theurgist utilize cosmic sympathy and thus prepare for psychic ascension.

=== Salvation Redux ===
Eleusinian Goddesses According to Proclus

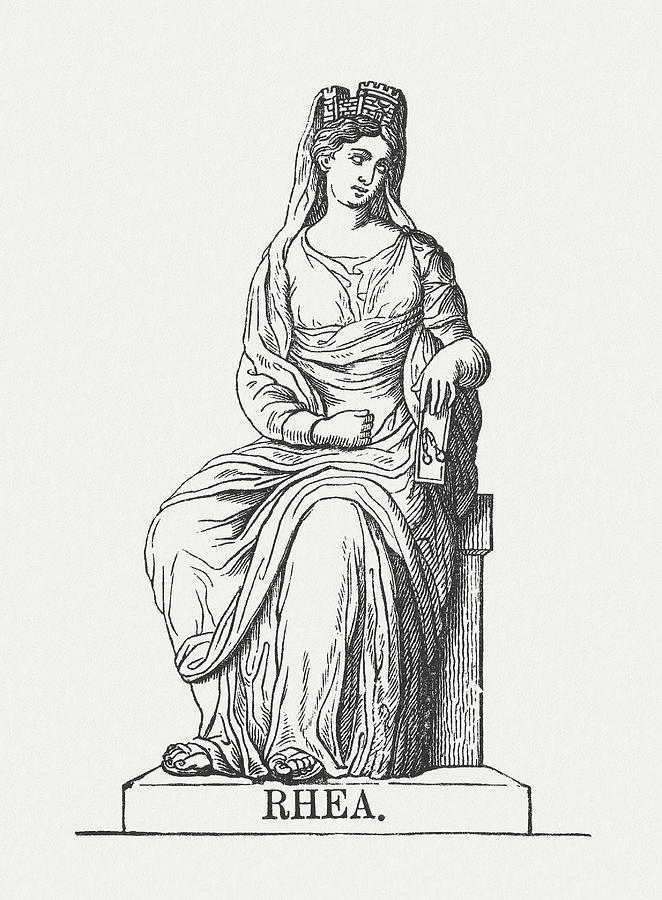
The Greek goddess Rhea. For the Chaldean theurgists Hekate and Rhea are equated. They produce the divine mixing bowl from which the universal and human soul are created.

|

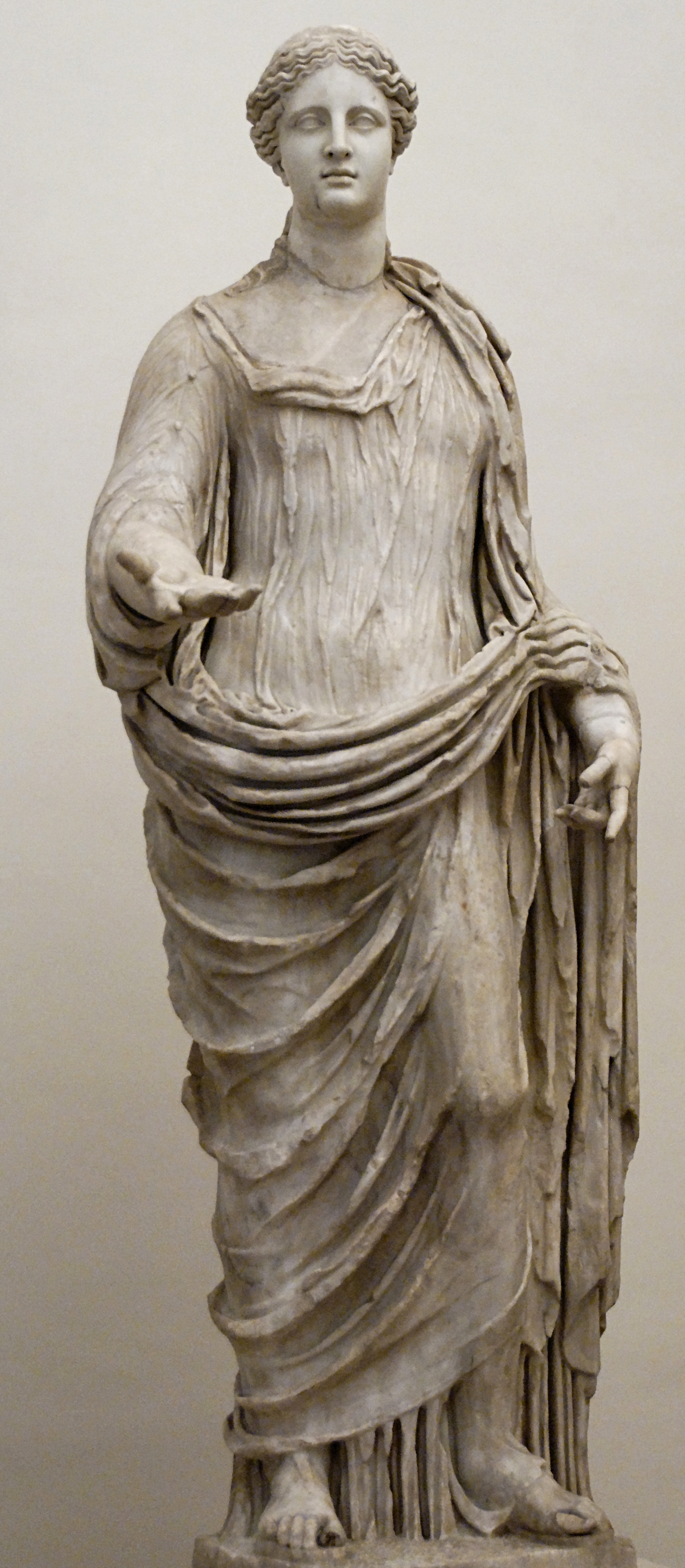
A marble statue of Demeter, National Roman Museum, Rome, Italy. From her right flank, universal life rushes forth. From her left side, virginal virtue comes forth.

|

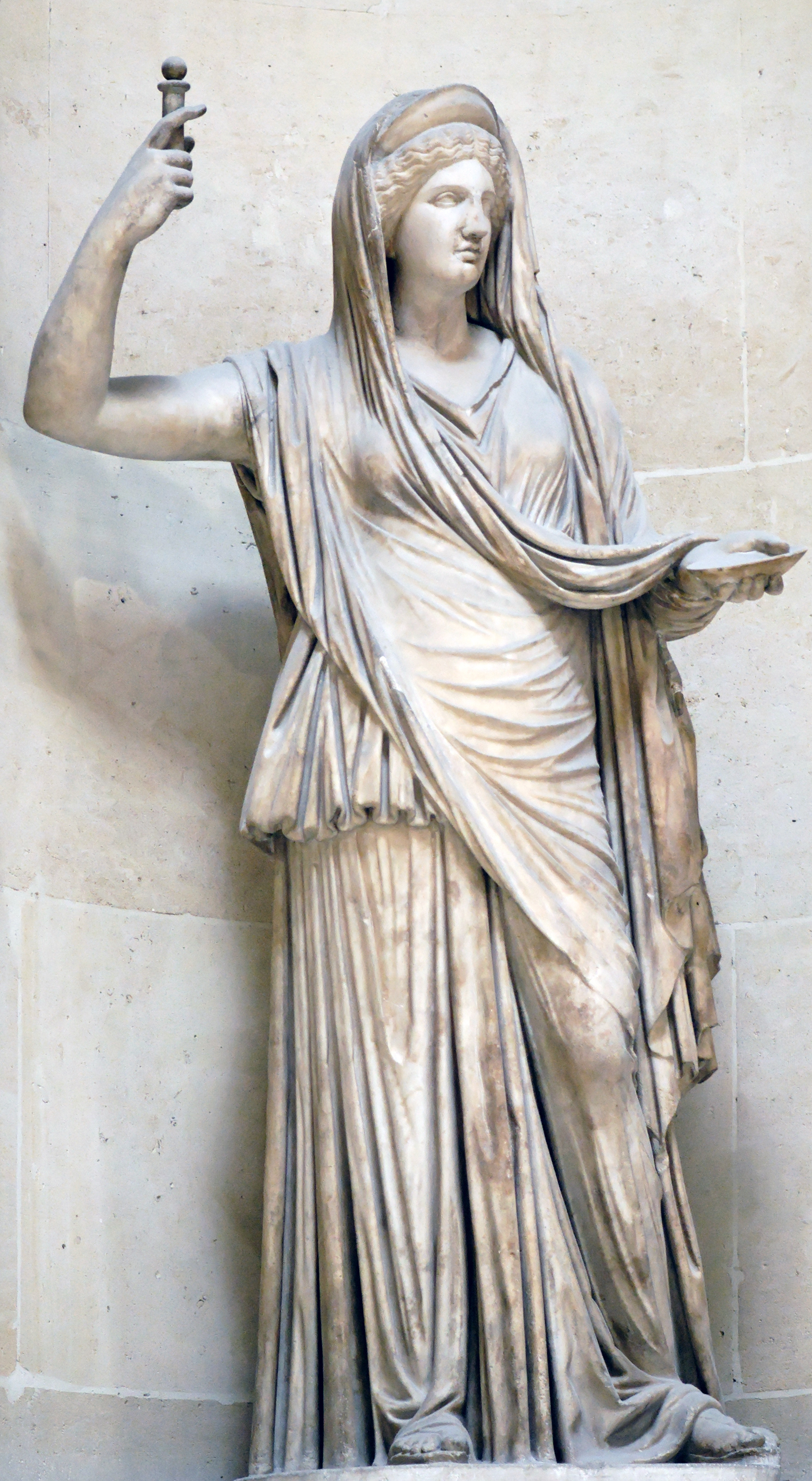
The Campana Hera, a 2nd century Roman copy of a Hellenistic original. Louvre, Paris. Flowing from the right side of Demeter, Hera produces "primordially-generated Soul".

Eleusinian Goddesses According to Proclus

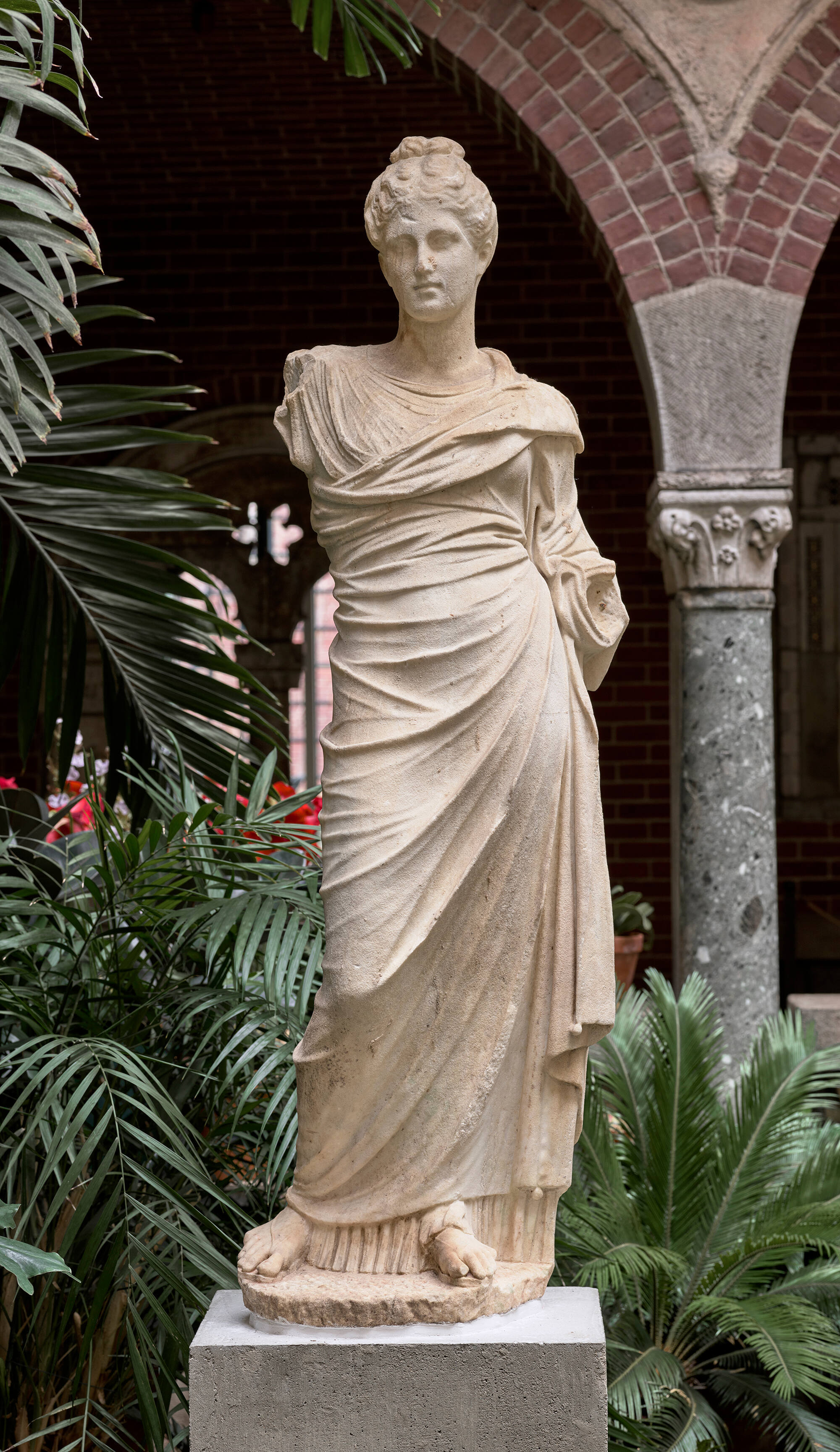
Marble statue of possibly Persephone; sculpted from Greek island marble during the first century BCE or CE, based on a Praxitelean funerary figure. Generated by Demeter, Perspehone represents cosmic, virginal virtue.

|

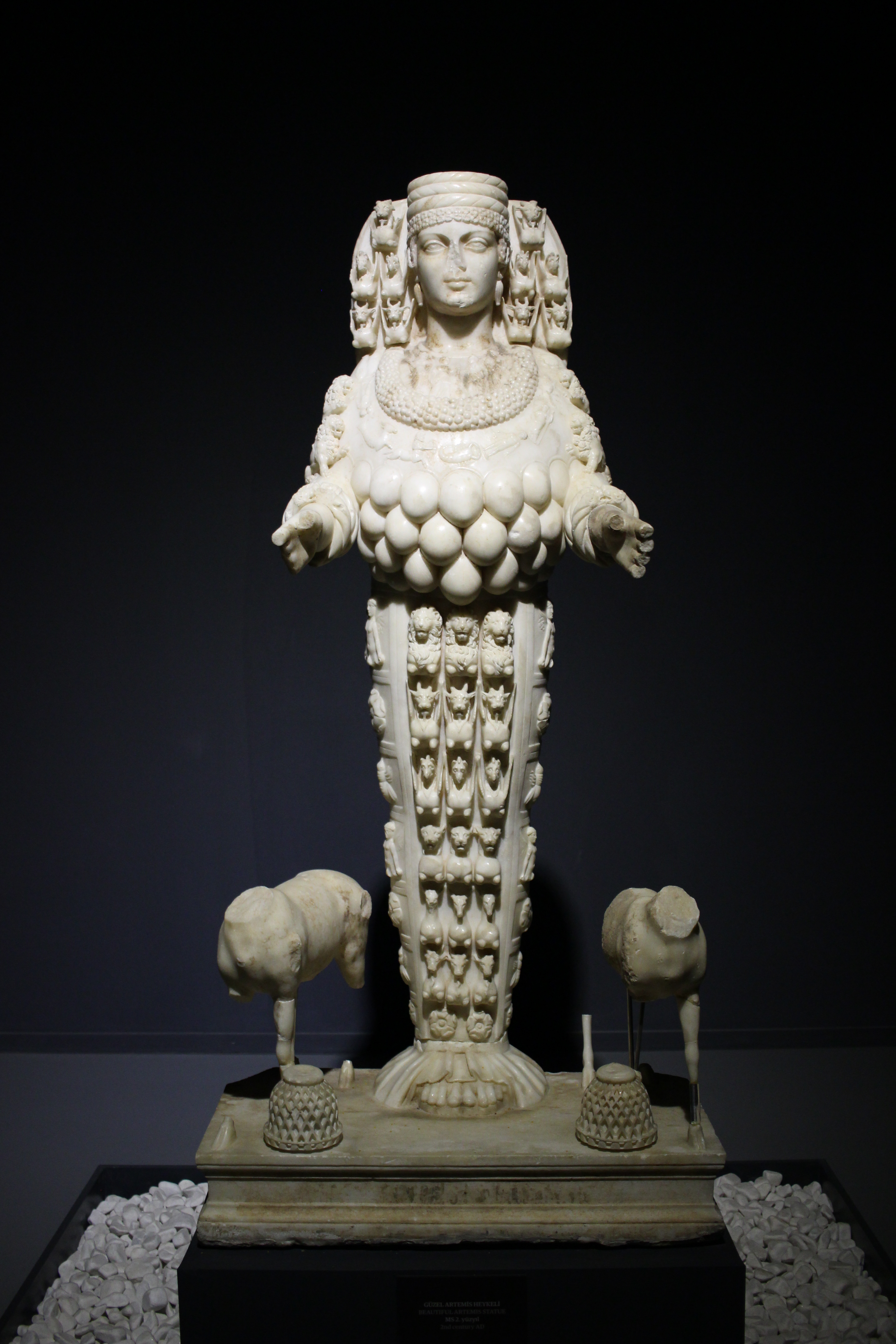
The Artemis of Ephesus, 2nd century CE. Ephesus Archaeological Museum. Generated by Persephone as part of the universal virtue.

|

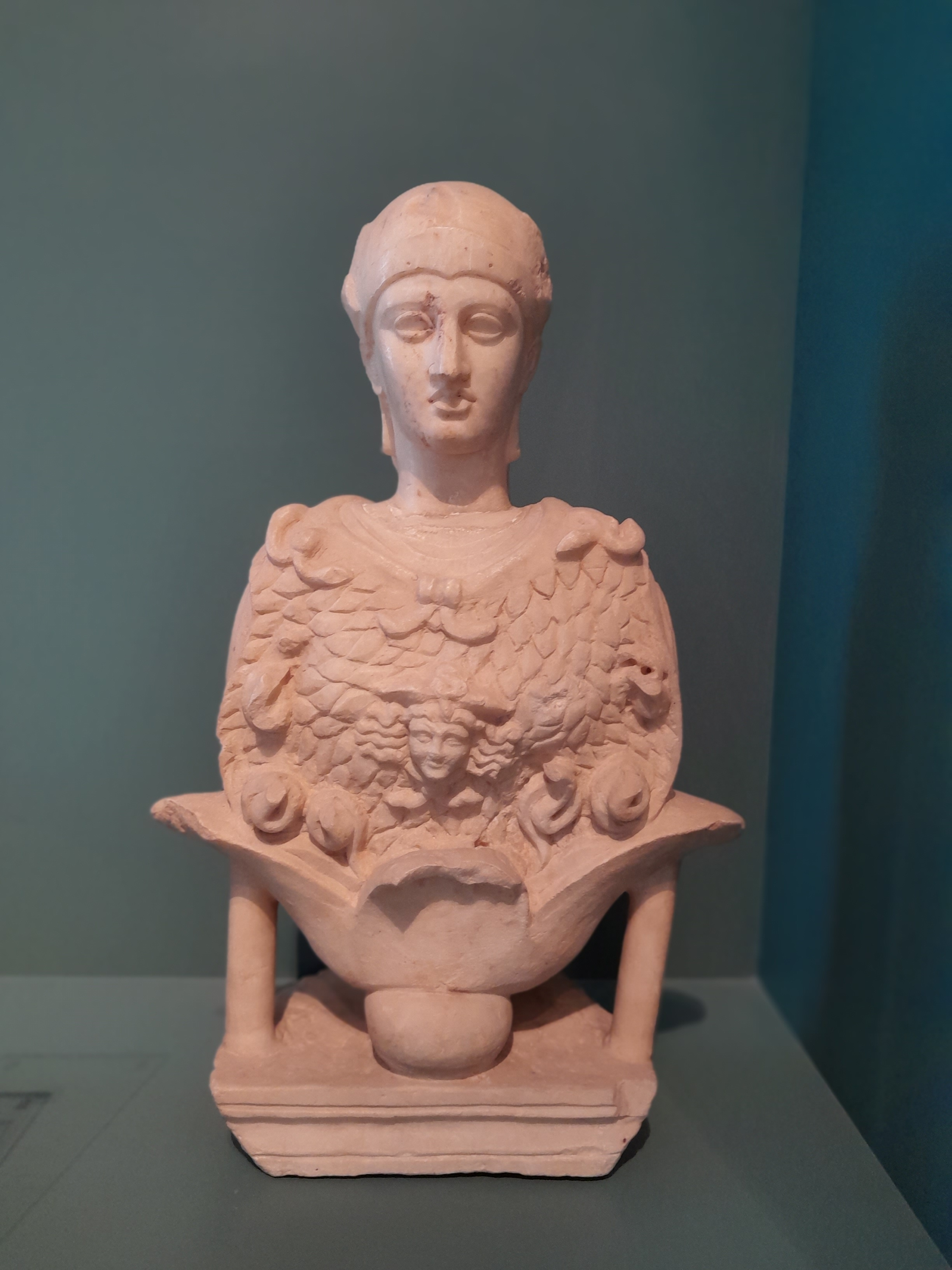
Athena bust. Also generated by Persephone as an aspect of universal virtue.

Once Chaldean Hekate’s identification with the World Soul is dispelled, however, the role she plays in salvation of the soul poses a problem. In this context, Brisson and Turner identify the Chaldean Hekate with the mixing bowl (krater) of creation, drawn from Plato’s Timaeus, the mixing bowl in which the spark of the human soul has its source.

Van den Berg disputes this view, however:

This [the failure of the thesis that she is the World Soul] means that Hecate stands in a very distant relation to the individual human souls and hence cannot act as a mediator between us and the gods. This begs the question how she can be the saviour of the human souls that she is supposed to be.

Countering Brisson’s and Turner’s thesis that Hekate’s salvific action occurs because she is the Timaean mixing bowl in which the universal and individual human souls are created, through close analysis of Proclus van den Berg shows that this is incorrect. In her role as Hekate-Rhea, she is not the mixing bowl; she creates the mixing bowl, embodied as the goddess Demeter.

According to van den Berg, Hekate’s salvific action comes about through her placement in the traditional framework of the Eleusinian Mysteries. The soul returns to the source of itself, the krater, the life-bringing goddess Hera, which Proclus says is an emanation of Hekate-Rhea.

As has been mentioned before, for Proclus Hekate-Rhea comprises a complex of Orphic-Eleusinian feminine divinities that include “Rhea Demeter, and Persephone in the Mysteries and Hecate in the Chaldaean tradition”. In this arrangement, Hera is the Timaean mixing bowl itself.

With this salvific hierarchy in place, in their anagogic ascension the theurgist will eventually become light and in this way return to the source of light, the Demiurge. The soul can

rest in God, drawing in the flowering flames which come down from the Father. From these flames, as they are descending, the soul plucks the soul-nourishing flower of fiery fruits.

. For Proclus, this means becoming a god.

== Hekate in Theurgic Ritual ==
The Chaldean Oracles report that Hekate responds to human requests and manifests herself to certain rites, invocations, and petitions.

However, little is known of the theurgic rites connected to the direct worship of Hekate. Proclus’s hymn to Hekate mentions “soul-stirring rituals”, which may have corresponded closely with various fire rites related to purification. Proclus implies that performing these rites will bestow upon the participant “good things” and protect one against health issues.

Johnston has reconstructed from the Chaldean Oracle fragments the outline of a manifestation rite. It begins with Hekate’s invocation. Her manifestation produces various light phenomena and visions including the appearance of childlike entities, including a child of fire on horseback. But these are only prelude to the goddess’s own appearance, which is pure light. Johnston rearranges the order of the fragments as they appear in the Majercik/des Places text, thereby producing the following rite:

147. If you speak to me often, you will perceive everything in lion-form. For neither does the curved mass of heaven appear then nor do the stars shine. The light of the moon is hidden, and the earth is not firmly secured, but everything is seen by flashes of lightning.

146....after this invocation, (it says) you will either see a fire, similar to a child, extended by bounds over the billow of air, or you will see a formless fire, from which a voice is sent forth, or you will see a sumptuous light, rushing like a spiral around the field. But you may even see a horse, more dazzling than light, or even a child mounted on the nimble back of a horse, (a child) of fire or covered with gold or, again, a naked (child) or even (a child) shooting a bow and standing on the back (of a horse).

148. But when you see the formless, very holy fire shining by leaps and bounds throughout the depths of the whole world, (then) listen to the voice of the fire.

The light phenomena would explain Proclus’ descriptions of “soul-stirring rituals” in his poem on Hekate. For Johnston, these phenomena in a ritual of light helps the theurgist determine true manifestations of the goddess as opposed to those presented by demons. Johnston elaborates:

Study of these fragments has clarified the sequence of events leading to Hekate’s epiphany and the identity of the entities who accompany her. This clarification, in turn, illuminates further the nature of Chaldean Hekate. First, she manifested herself, not anthropomorphically or theomorphically, but as a formless, speaking fire, an apparition that combines the platonic concept of perfection – incorporeality – and the Chaldean divinization of fire. This portrayal of Hekate differs from that of the magical papyri and many other late sources; she is not terrifying or repulsive but rather awe-inspiringly beautiful.

Following Proclus, van den Berg reconstructs an Eleusinian initiation rite based on Hekate’s identification in the Chaldean Oracles with the Titanic goddess Rhea and the Eleusinian rites. Proclus sees a direct line of association between Hekate-Rhea, Hera, Demeter, and Persephone, and her emanations. Linked in this way, van den Berg speculates that Hekate is associated with the Eleusinian initiation rites of death and resurrection. As described by van den Berg, this rite would provide further insight into the context of the sacred consecration rite described by Lewy and Finamore. (See the more detailed description of Salvation Redux.)

In fragment 224, we also learn how the devotee should fashion and consecrate the statue of the goddess. Consecrating and animating statues is an important task of the theurgist, so this rite would be important for the theurgic devotee of Hekate. The consecration takes place under a waxing moon, and involves a lizard and herbs like myrrh, frankincense, and gum.

== Associated Conceptions of Chaldean Hekate ==
In the same way as Dillon, Turner and Majercik note the similarities of Hekate with Gnostic depictions of feminine emanations of the Godhead. The most obvious example is the Gnostic depiction of Sophia. But Hekate in the Chaldean Oracles is a positive power, not negative as are many of the female powers in the Gnostic texts.

Van den Berg places Chaldean Hekate within the cultural matrix of the Eleusinian Mysteries. Following Proclus’s exegesis in the Platonic Theology and the commentary on Cratylus, Hekate is associated with Rhea, and by emanation, Hera, Demeter, and Persephone, etc.

Polymnia Athanassiadi places the provenance of the Chaldean Oracles in Apamea, a Syrian town on the borders of the Roman Empire. Athanassiadi believes this is the milieu of the Chaldean Julian, father of Julian the Theurgist, author of the Oracles. With this provenance in mind, Ronan draws similarities between the Chaldean Hekate and the ancient Syrian goddess, Atargatis.

== Iconography ==
Hekate with lion-maned serpent

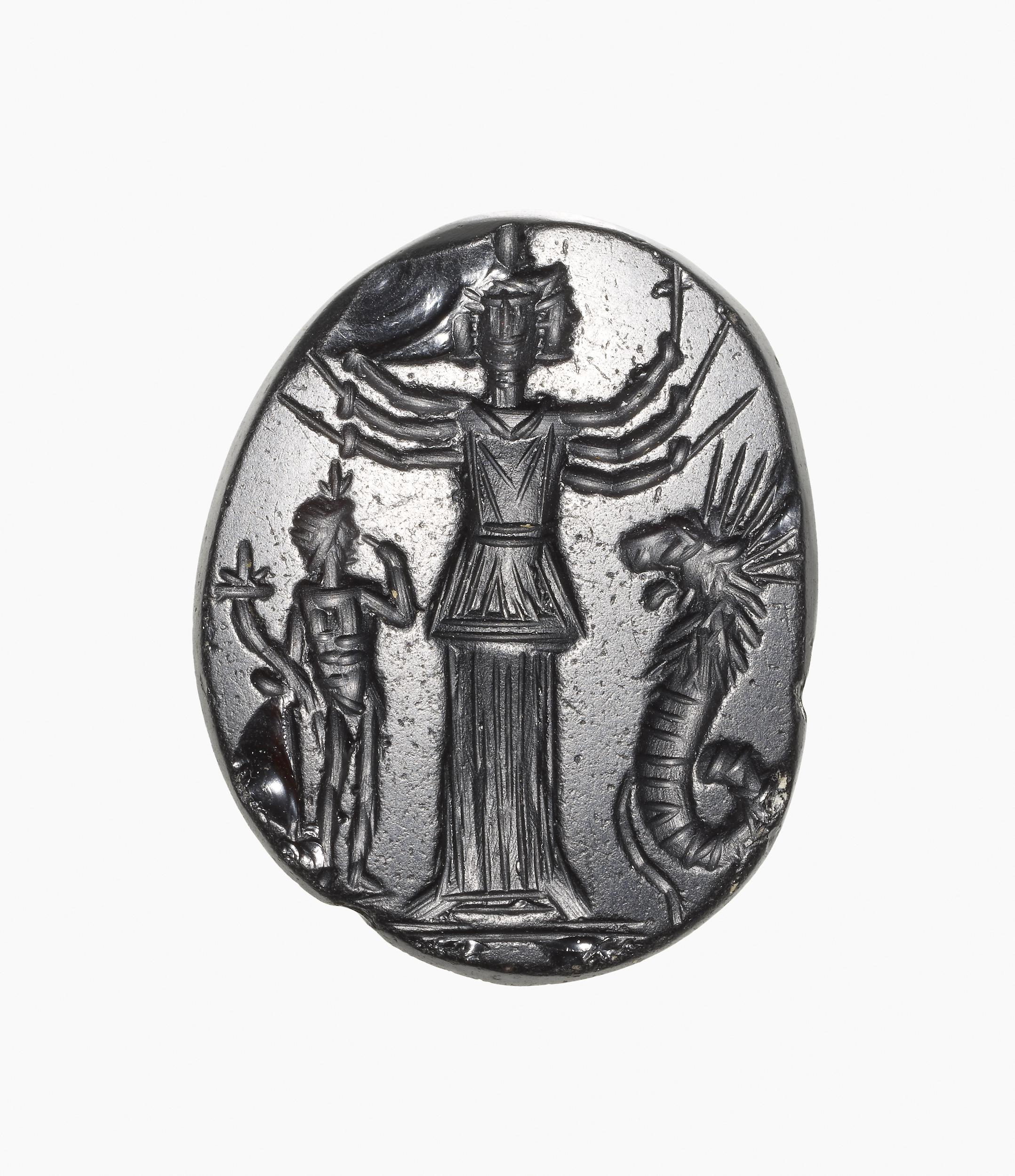
Hekate (Hecate) trimorph in peplas holding six swords; nude youth holding cornucopia; rayed lion-headed serpent; on the reverse: ouroboros enclosing two lines of stars.

Like the indigenous Greek goddess, Chaldean Hekate has three faces. Variations on this traditional imagery are described, though no examples exist. Brisson suggests a cultic image may have existed of her, showing “Hekate’s left side, right side, and back” and universal life gushing from her right side and virtue rushing from her left side, reflecting the description in Chaldean fragments 52 and 54.

Proclus mentions a four-faced statue. Ronan quotes Lydus’s description of the statue:

From whence they [viz. the Chaldean tradition ] hand down the mystical doctrine concerning the four elements and four-headed Hekate. For the firebreathing head of a horse is clearly raised towards the sphere of fire, and the head of a bull, which snorts like some bellowing spirit [daimonion], is raised towards the sphere of air; and the head of a hydra as being of a sharp and unstable nature is raised towards the sphere of water, and that of a dog as having a punishing and avenging nature is raised towards the sphere of earth.

Following Italicus, Ronan also notes her association with serpents:

How would it sound if I were to speak of Hekate's hair, of her temples [of her forehead], of her hips and of the Sources around her head and about her girdles I speak indeed of the Fire-filled Source, the She-Serpent, and the Snake-girdled: others calling her on account of her appearance Girt m serpent coils, and in addition to these epithets, Lion-possessing.

Finally, Ronan notes the association of Hekate in the oracles with lions. Rhea, whom the Chaldeans equate to Hekate, is closely linked to lions. See the accompanying graphic of an obsidian magic stone depicting Hekate and a lion-maned serpent.

== Devotional Aspects ==
As mentioned in the section on Hekatean ritual, the Chaldean Oracles report that Chaldean Hekate replies to direct invocation, and manifests in various forms of light to the petitioner. The relationship with Hekate can be quite personal. Proclus is reported by his disciple, Marinus, to have spoken with the goddess and collected their conversations in a book:

Marinus informs us that Proclus, after he had gone through the Chaldaean purificatory rites, conversed with luminous apparitions of Hecate. Such was eye-witnessed by others. Proclus recorded these events in a special book now lost (Marinus Vita Procli § 28).

The process of Christian destruction of Greco-Roman culture did its work.

== Influenced ==
Majercik and Turner see aspects of the Chaldean Hekate in Sethian gnosticism.
