= Luigi Mancinelli =

Italian conductor, cellist and composer (1848–1921)

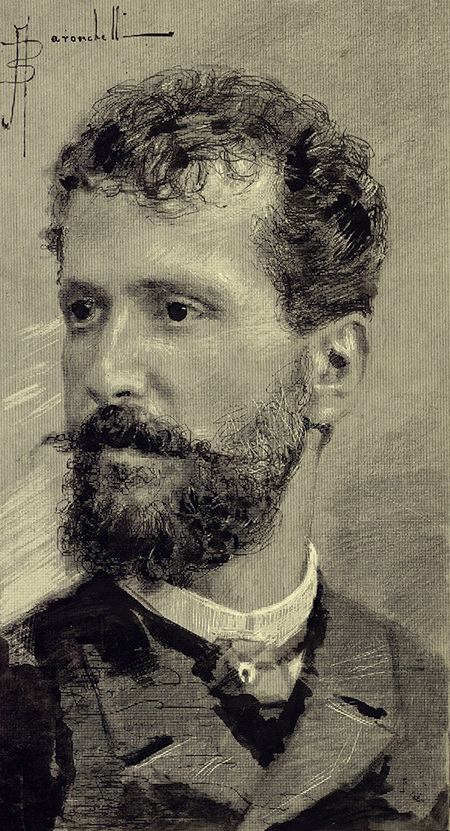
Mancinelli by F. Garibotti

Luigi Mancinelli (Italian pronunciation: [luˈiːdʒi mantʃiˈnɛlli]; 5 February 1848 – 2 February 1921) was an Italian conductor, cellist and composer. His early career was in Italy, where he established a reputation in Perugia and then Bologna. After 1886 he worked mostly in other countries, as principal conductor at the Royal Opera House, Covent Garden in London and at the "Old Metropolitan" Opera House in New York, and in other appointments in Madrid, Rio de Janeiro and Buenos Aires.

Mancinelli was highly regarded not only in the Italian repertory, in which he first came to prominence, but also in German and French opera. Despite his high reputation as a conductor, his compositions met with limited success, and none of them entered the regular repertoire.

== Life and career ==
=== Early years ===
Mancinelli was born in Orvieto in central Italy. He studied organ and cello with his elder brother, Marino Mancinelli (who later became a well-known conductor in Italian opera houses) and then played as a cellist in the Orvieto cappella and the orchestra of the Teatro della Pergola in Florence. In Florence he studied composition with Teodulo Mabellini. In 1874 he moved to the Teatro Morlacchi in Perugia, as principal cellist and assistant maestro concertatore. He made his conducting debut there in Aida when the regular conductor was unable to appear, owing to temporary inebriety. The impresario Vincenzo Jacovacci was present, and engaged Mancinelli for the Teatro Apollo, Rome, where he conducted until 1881. He quickly built a reputation; in 1877 Boito called him the ideal interpreter of Mefistofele, and he was regarded by Giovannina Lucca, the holder of the Italian rights to Wagner operas, as Angelo Mariani's successor as Italy's leading Wagner conductor. Wagner himself rated Mancinelli highly.

=== International career ===
In July 1878 Mancinelli conducted in Paris for the first time. In Italy he worked principally in Bologna, conducting opera at the Teatro Comunale, serving as maestro di cappella at the basilica of San Petronio and teaching at the Liceo Musicale, where his students included Giacomo Orefice. Throughout his career Mancinelli composed in addition to conducting. His first opera, Isora di Provenza (1884) was successful in Bologna but failed in Naples two years later. After that, Mancinelli's career was chiefly out of Italy. In June 1886 he conducted a concert in London, consisting of Beethoven's Fifth Symphony and a selection of his own compositions. Having resigned his posts in Bologna, he accepted an invitation from the impresario Augustus Harris to join Alberto Randegger as conductor of a season in June and July 1887 at the Theatre Royal, Drury Lane with a starry international cast and a wide repertoire of Italian, French, Austrian and German operas. (Note: The repertoire comprised Aida, The Barber of Seville, La traviata, Rigoletto, Les Huguenots, Faust, Carmen, Don Giovanni and Lohengrin.)

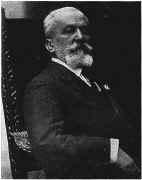
Mancinelli in later years

Harris took over the management of the Royal Opera House, Covent Garden in 1888, and appointed Mancinelli its chief conductor, a post he held until 1905. He rapidly improved musical standards. Within weeks of his appointment, a French critic commented, "Under M. Mancinelli's baton, his orchestra has achieved the homogeneity that it lacked at first; now it is worthy of Covent Garden". When Harris and Mancinelli took over, the house was officially known as "The Royal Italian Opera House", and operas of any nationality were sung in Italian – Die Zauberflöte being given as Il flauto magico etc. Gradually the policy was changed so that generally operas were sung in the language in which they were originally written. By the 1890s Mancinelli was conducting performances of Faust and Roméo et Juliette in French and Lohengrin in German, although Die Meistersinger continued to be given in Italian translation until 1899, by which time Mancinelli had largely ceded the German repertoire to guest conductors from Germany, in this case Karl Muck. Among the British premieres conducted by Mancinelli was Verdi's final opera, Falstaff, in May 1894. The production featured alterations that Verdi had made to the score since the world premiere in Milan a year earlier, but some of Mancinelli's tempi raised critical eyebrows.

Mancinelli was chief conductor at the Madrid opera, 1887–1893, and at the Metropolitan Opera House (the "Old Met"), New York, 1893–1903. At the latter he conducted mostly Italian or French operas, including some relative rarities such as Semiramide, Orfeo ed Euridice, Lucia di Lammermoor and L'Africaine. In the German repertoire, he conducted Lohengrin, Die Meistersinger and Tannhäuser (all given in Italian, as was the Met's practice at the time). As at Covent Garden, Mancinelli introduced Falstaff, but with a starrier cast than in London, including Victor Maurel in the title role and Emma Eames and Zélie de Lussan as Alice and Nannetta Ford. He conducted the first Met performance of what became the familiar double-bill of Cavalleria rusticana and Pagliacci, although on that occasion the latter was given first. Other operas that received their Met premieres under Mancinelli include The Magic Flute, Don Giovanni and La bohème.

Mancinelli conducted opera in Italy until 1911 and during seasons at the Teatro Nacional de São Carlos, Lisbon, from 1901 to 1919–20. In 1905 he was at the Rio de Janeiro opera and in May 1908 he conducted Aida, inaugurating the new Teatro Colón, Buenos Aires, returning there in 1909, 1910 and 1913.

== Personal life ==
In 1881, Mancinelli married Luisa Cora, in Turin.

He died in Rome on 2 February 1921, aged 72.

== Works ==
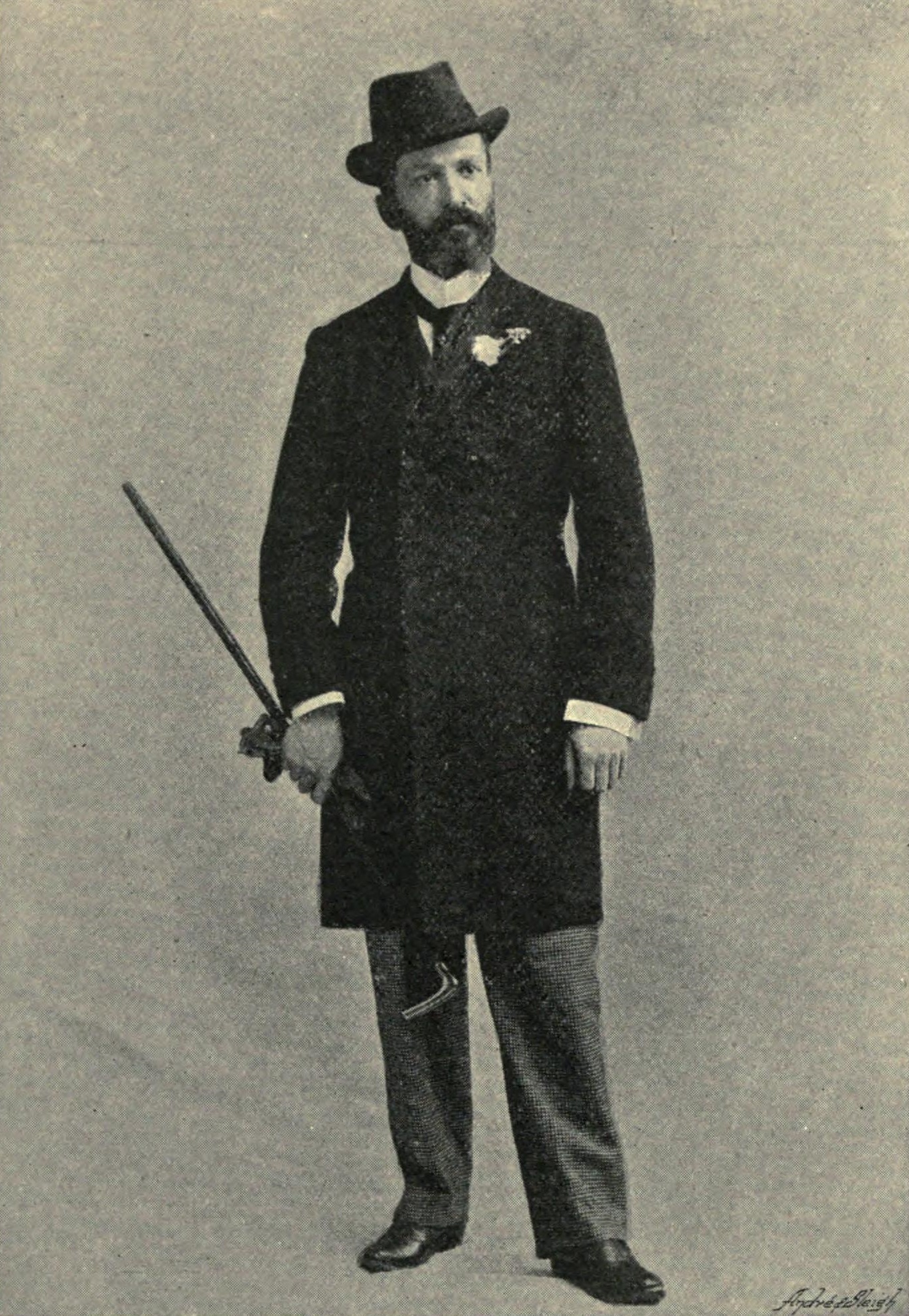
Luigi Mancinelli

Although Mancinelli was regarded by contemporaries as a conductor who also composed, he took his compositions with great seriousness, and was disappointed that they made little impact on the public. His "tragica lirica" Ero e Leandro, premiered at the Norwich Festival in 1896, was later given in Madrid, London, New York, and several Italian cities, but did not sustain a place in the repertory. Grove's Dictionary of Music and Musicians comments that Mancinelli's lack of success as a composer:

was probably caused partly by a dramatic temperament strongly at variance with the dominating currents in Italian opera at the time, as manifested in the verismo school and Puccini. This is evident also in his rather abstract treatment of his characters, a tendency emphasised by his lack of facility in creating memorable melodies.

=== Operas ===
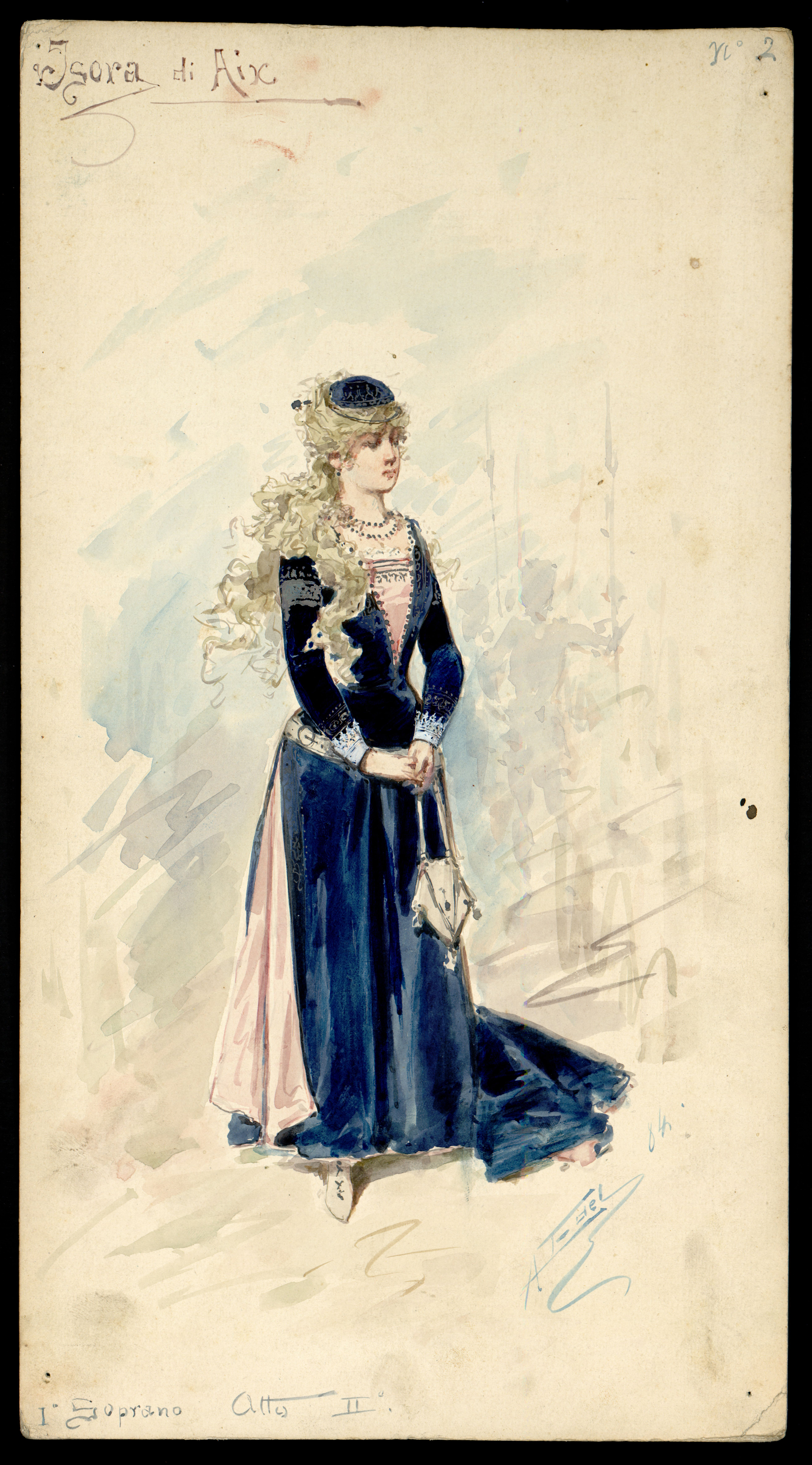
Isora di Aix, costume design by Alfredo Edel for Isora di Provenza Act 2 (1884).

- Isora di Provenza (3 acts, A. Zanardini; Bologna, 1884)
- Ero e Leandro (3 acts, Arrigo Boito; Norwich Festival, 1896)
- Paolo e Francesca (1 act, Arturo Colautti; Bologna, 1907)
- Sogno di una notte d'estate (3 acts, Fausto Salvatori; 1919)

=== Other stage works ===
- Messalina (Prelude and intermezzo for the drama by Pietro Cossa, 1876)
- Cleopatra (Symphonic intermezzi for the drama by Pietro Cossa, 1877)
- Tizianello (Five pieces for the comedy by E. Lombroso, 1880)
- Isaia (Cantata, words by Giuseppe Albini, 1887)

=== Film scores ===
- Frate Sole (Scored for chorus and orchestra from the tale by Mario Corsi, Tespi-films, Rome; 1918)
- Giuliano l'Apostata (Scored for chorus and orchestra from the tale by Ugo Falena, Bernini-films, Rome; 1920)

== Notes, references and sources ==
=== Sources ===
- Kuhn, Laura (2001). Baker's Biographical Dictionary of Musicians (8th ed.). New York: Schirmer. ISBN 978-0-02-866091-2.
- Parker, E. D. (1900). Opera under Augustus Harris. London: Saxon. OCLC 21923947.
