= Frate Sole =

- Directed by: Ugo Falena and Mario Corsi
- Distributed by: Essanay Studios; General Film Company
- Release date: 1918
- Running time: 70 minutes
- Country: Italy
- Language: Silent

Frate Sole (Brother Sun) is a 1918 Italian silent film based on the life of St Francis of Assisi, directed by Ugo Falena and Mario Corsi.

The film has four episodes, The kiss of the leper, In the footsteps of St. Francis of Assisi, Time, and The stigmata.

The film was restored in 1998 with the assistance of Cineteca Italiana.

== Cast ==
- Umberto Palmarini as St Francis of Assisi
- Silvia Malinverni as Clare of Assisi
- Rina Calabria as Agnes of Assisi, sister of Clare
- Filippo Ricci as Elia Buonbarone
- Lucienne Myosa as Sibilia, la cortigiana
- Bruno Emanuel Palmi as a nobleman
