= Abrotelia =

- Born: c. 5th century BC; Tarentum

Philosophical work
- Era: Ancient philosophy
- Region: Ancient Greek philosophy
- School: Pythagoreanism

Abrotelia (Ancient Greek: Αβροτέλεια) (fl. 5th century BC) was a female Pythagorean philosopher from Tarentum, Magna Graecia. She was one of seventeen women included in the Life of Pythagoras written by Iamblichus as part of his treatise On Pythagoreanism.

Ethel Kersey has suggested that Abrotelia wrote or taught in traditional philosophical fields such as metaphysics, logic, and aesthetics.
