= De Mysteriis =

De Mysteriis may refer to:

- De Mysteriis Aegyptiorum by Iamblichus
- De Mysteriis Dom Sathanas, studio album by the Norwegian black metal band Mayhem
- De Vermis Mysteriis (album), studio album by American heavy metal band High on Fire
- De Vermis Mysteriis, fictional grimoire
