= Ileana Leonidoff =

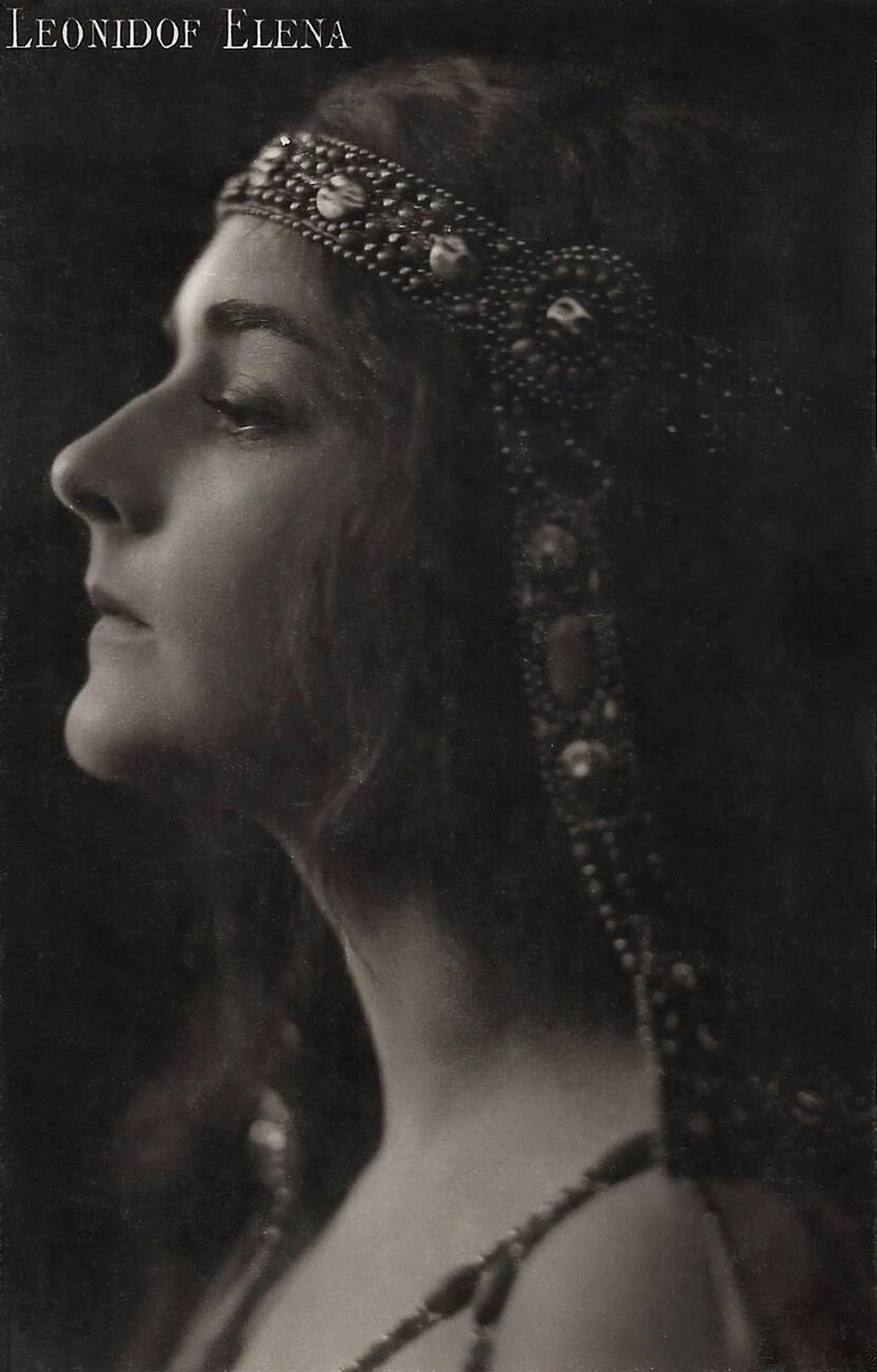
- Born: Elena Sergeevna Pisarevskaya; 3 March 1893; Sevastopol, Russian Empire
- Died: 1 January 1968 (aged 74)
- Other names: Helena Leonidof, Ileana Leonidova
- Occupations: singer, dancer, silent film star
- Years active: 1917–1966

Ileana Leonidoff (3 March 1893 – 1 January 1968) is a pseudonym for Elena Sergeevna Pisarevskaya (Russian: Елена Сергеевна Писаревская), a Russian-born emigrée who first made a career in Italy in silent films and then as a noted dancer and choreographer. She was the founder and lead dancer of the Dance School of Teatro dell'Opera di Roma. During World War II, she fled to South America, first teaching in Argentina and then in Ecuador in 1950. She was the first director of the Ballet Oficial de Bolivia, then served as the director of the Guayaquil Ballet in Ecuador, and became the founder of the Ballet School of Trujillo, Peru. She was honoured as a knight of the Order of the Condor of the Andes in 1953.

== Early life ==
Elena Sergeevna Pisarevskaya was born in 1893 in Sevastopol, a town on the Black Sea on the Crimean Peninsula during the Russian Imperial Period to Cleopatra Gavrilovna (née Sudkovskaya) and Rear Admiral Sergei Petrovic Pisarevsky. Her maternal uncle was the landscape painter, Rufin Sudkovsky and her father was a career naval officer who led the detachment of cruisers of the 3rd Squadron of the Pacific Fleet during the 1877–1878 Russo-Turkish War and in 1905 was made a Vice Admiral of the Black Sea Fleet. Pisarevskaya had two siblings: a brother, also named Sergei (1882–1949), who later served in the Russian army and a sister, Lida (later Marskaja), who would also become a dancer. After their father's death in 1908, Cleopatra brought her daughters to Milan around 1911, where Pisarevskaya's first performances were for charitable events and concerts held by the Accademia Filarmonica Romana in 1916. A few months later in her second performance, she developed laryngitis and performed as a dancer, changing the direction of her career.

== Italian career ==
In 1917, Pisarevskaya, now using the stage name of Ileana Leonidoff, was chosen by Anton Giulio Bragaglia to appear in his silent film Thaïs. For her film debut, Leonidoff portrayed the Countess Bianca Stagno-Belincioni, who is involved in a love triangle between Thaïs and the Count of San Remo. Subsequently she appeared in a series of films directed by Aldo Molinari, including Saffo (1918), Venere (1919), Il mistero di Osiris (1919) and Giuditta e Oloferne (1920), as well as in Attilla (1918) directed by Febo Mari and as Eusebia in Giuliano l'Apostata (1920) directed by Ugo Falena. In all, Pisarevskaya made seventeen film appearances between 1917 and 1922, when she left film to return full-time to dancing. Even during the time she was making films, Leonidoff continued to dance, performing in 1918 for the opening of the Galleria L'Epoca in Rome and in 1919 performing original dances at the Teatro Costanzi, as well as in a production of Carmen.

In 1920, Leonidoff and Molinari founded the Leonidoff Russian Ballet, in which Molinari handled the costuming and scenery, and Leonidoff choreographed the plays they selected. That same year, Leonidoff married Giuseppe Massera, and used the name Leonidoff-Massera for some performances. As an introduction to their ballet, the pair offered The Swan Dance at a party on 22 May 1920 with a positive reception. The formal debut of the company followed on 28 May 1920 at the Teatro Quirino di Roma, where Leonidoff performed five dances: Canzoni Arabe (Arab Songs), Fantasia indiana (Indian Fantasy), Foglie d' Autunno (Autumn Leaves), Pirrica and Sèvres de la Vieille France. After touring for the summer, the ballet corps returned to Rome and performed at the Teatro Costanzi, adding two new choreographies, Scherzo veneziano (Venetian Scherzo) and Fiaba russa (Russian Fables), to much acclaim. The following year, Leonidoff Ballet toured Italy, performing in Bologna, Milan, Palermo and Venice. The tour was repeated for those cities in 1922 and added venues in Brescia, Florence and Turin.

From the end of 1922 to 1924, the company, which sometimes billed itself as Leonidoff Italian Ballet or simply Ballet Leonidoff to avoid confusion with Ballets Russes performed in Austria, England, France, Germany, and The Netherlands. The tour was very successful until the spring of 1924. When they attempted to return to Milan after running out of money, Leonidoff's husband was detained in debtors' prison in Brixton. The arrest did not deter Leonidoff, whose rise to fame continued. While in London, she had hired Dimitri Rostoff, who journeyed back to Italy with the company. In 1926, she performed in La Sulamita to music written by Amilcare Zanella, which was widely recognized. In 1927, her performance at the Teatro Quirinetta di Roma was not only critically acclaimed, but also secured her a position to become the first director of the Royal Opera House. Simultaneously, Leonidoff became the founder and first director of the dance school attached to the Opera, along with her partner Rostoff.

Leonidoff becomes the official dancer of the Mussolini regime and she and Rostoff perform at many significant national functions, like the landing of the Italian naval fleet in Ostia in July 1927, for celebrations in the gardens of the Mussolini Museum, at official opening for the Olympic Trials, the fall festivals held at the Villa Celimontana, and others. In the dance school, Leonidoff taught women and children, while Rostoff instructed male dancers. Their first production at the Royal Opera House was held in 1928, and featured La Giara by Alfredo Casella, with Casella conducting the orchestra. At a time when the fascist definition of gender roles dictated that women should be in the home and not the workplace, Leonidoff's embrace by the government was unusual. By 1931, she was replaced by Nicola Guerra, and the Leonidoff Ballet went back on tour, performing abroad. By 1933, both her marriage to Massera and her partnership with Rostoff had dissolved. Leonidoff soon married the French director André Gardes, and began collaborating with other artists on new choreographies, such as Alexey Tsereteli and his Russian Opera in Paris performances in Barcelona of Boris Godunov, Sadko, and The Tale of Tsar Saltan, Amilcare Ponchielli for choreography on La Gioconda and Alfredo Catalani for the dance arrangements in Loreley, among others. Two of her last Italian choreographic works were for Mahit by Riccardo Pick-Mangiagalli in 1938 and for The Three-Cornered Hat by Manuel de Falla performed at the Teatro Carlo Felice in Genoa in 1939.

== South American career ==
It is unclear when Leonidoff moved to South America, but it may have been after her mother died in Nice in 1946. By 1947, she was teaching at the Teatro Argentino de La Plata and Teatro Nacional Cervantes, among others. In 1950 she moved to Ecuador, where she took charge of the ballet school for "The House of Culture of the Guayas" (Spanish: Casa de la Cultura del Guayas) in Guayaquil and staged a production of Swan Lake. One year later, Leonidoff moved to Bolivia when she was hired by the government to establish the Ballet Oficial de Bolivia. By 1952, she debuted with the National Symphony Orchestra, producing El hada de las muñecas (The Fairy Doll) by Josef Bayer and in 1953 was honored as a knight of the Order of the Condor of the Andes by president Víctor Paz Estenssoro. Leonidoff laid the foundation for the development of ballet in Bolivia and was the first to use live music rather than recorded music in productions. In 1954, she took the Bolivian company on tour to Lima, Peru and at that time, left the company, returning to Guayaquil.

When Leonidoff returned to the House of Culture, Kitty Sakilarides had already organized the dancers into beginners, intermediate and advanced classes, but Leonidoff restructured the organization into a ballet company with a corps de ballet, soloists and principal dancers. Making the organization a professional one, she trained dancers such as Noralma Vera Arrata, Piero Jaramillo, and Vilma Pombar, among others, before leaving Ecuador in 1961. In that year, she moved to Trujillo, Peru, where she founded and directed the Trujillo School of Ballet. In 1966, Peruvian newspapers announced that Leonidoff had returned to Europe.

== Death and legacy ==
After leaving Peru, traces of Leonidoff disappear, and her date and place of death are unknown. Leonidoff's biography, Ileana Leonidoff: lo schermo e la danza (Leonidas Leonidoff: the screen and the dance) was written by Laura Piccolo and published in Rome by Aracne in 2009.
