= Giuliano l'Apostata =

1919 film directed by Ugo Falena

- Directed by: Ugo Falena
- Written by: Luigi Mancinelli; Ugo Falena
- Starring: Guido Graziosi; Ileana Leonidoff
- Cinematography: Tullio Chiarini
- Music by: Luigi Mancinelli
- Production company: Bernini Film
- Distributed by: Cito-cinema
- Release date: September 1919
- Running time: 102 minutes
- Country: Italy
- Language: Italian

Giuliano l'Apostata is a 1919 Italian historical drama film directed by Ugo Falena, starring Guido Graziosi and Ileana Leonidoff. Set in the 4th century, it is a biographical film about the Roman Emperor Julian, known as Julian the Apostate for his rejection of Christianity.

Although Julian's paganism is shown to fail and Christianity to succeed, the portrayal of him is sympathetic. This plays into contemporary Italian discussions about church and state, caused by the gradual abolition of the papal Non Expedit, which previously had prevented Catholics from participating in Italian parliamentary elections.

Giuliano l'Apostata follows conventions for Italian peplum films which had been made fashionable by Cabiria from 1914. It is a melodrama with original music by Luigi Mancinelli and set design and costumes by Duilio Cambellotti. The film did not become popular and has received little attention over the years.

== Plot ==
Fearing a conspiracy, Constantius, the emperor of the Roman Empire, orders the execution of his uncle and the uncle's family, although the six-year-old boy Julian is spared. Julian is raised in Nicomedia; during the day he is taught Christianity by the Arian bishop Eusebius, but at night the old tutor Mardonius informs him about Homer and paganism. Attracted to paganism, Julian is initiated into theurgy by the neoplatonic philosopher Maximus of Ephesus.

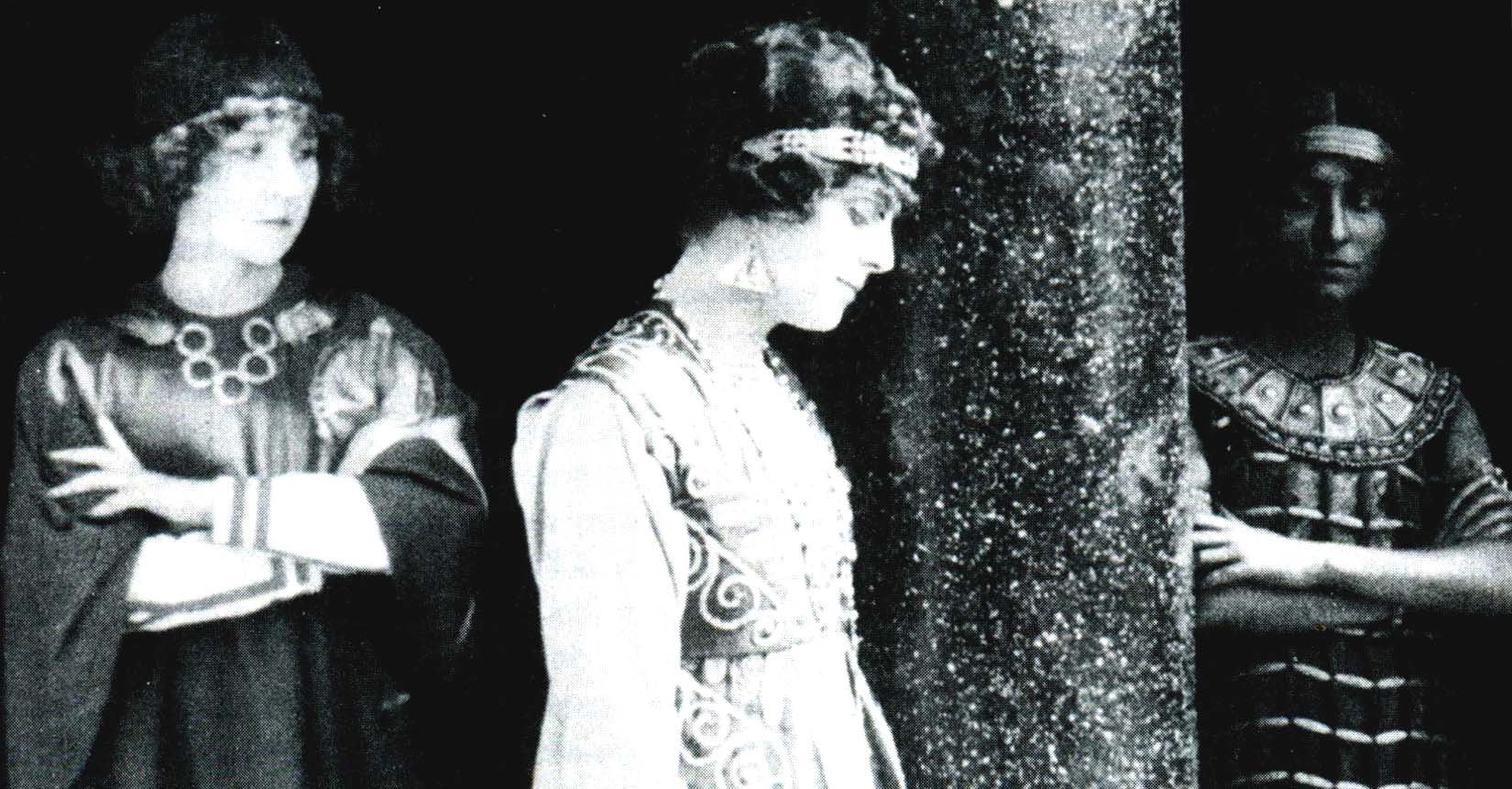
Marion May as Taianus, Silvia Malinverni as Helena and Rina Calabria as Isa

Constantius summons the grown-up Julian to Milan where he is given the title of caesar, at the time signifying a subordinate to the emperor. In Milan, Julian falls in love with and seduces the empress Eusebia. At the same time, Constantius' younger sister Helena falls in love with Julian, and Helena's slave Taianus, who secretly loves Helena, becomes jealous of Julian. Constantius wants to strengthen the family bond and arranges so that Julian is married to Helena. As a wedding gift, Eusebia gives Helena her slave Isa.

Julian settles in Gaul where he successfully fights back rebelling Gaulish tribes. Constantius becomes jealous of his cousin's success and orders him to send his best troops to Byzantium, but the soldiers rebel and proclaim Julian their emperor. Soon thereafter, Helena falls dead, having been poisoned by Isa on order from Eusebia. Julian decides to seek revenge and claim the throne in Byzantium.

Before he can suppress Julian's rebellion, Constantius becomes fatally ill, and Eusebia persuades him to make Julian his successor. After Julian enters Byzantium, he is unconvinced by Eusebia's claim that she acted out of love, and Eusebia ends up committing suicide. As emperor, Julian tries to restore the ancient Greek religion, but reality does not live up to his visions; instead, what he seeks is suggested to exist in a Christian hymn. Julian is derided by the Christian population, and the temple of Apollo is burned down. Disillusioned, he embarks on a campaign in Persia. There, his army suffers from an ambush and Julian is hit by an arrow. The person who shot the arrow was not a Persian, but Taianus. Collapsing, Julian utters his last words: "You have won, Galilean!"

== Cast ==
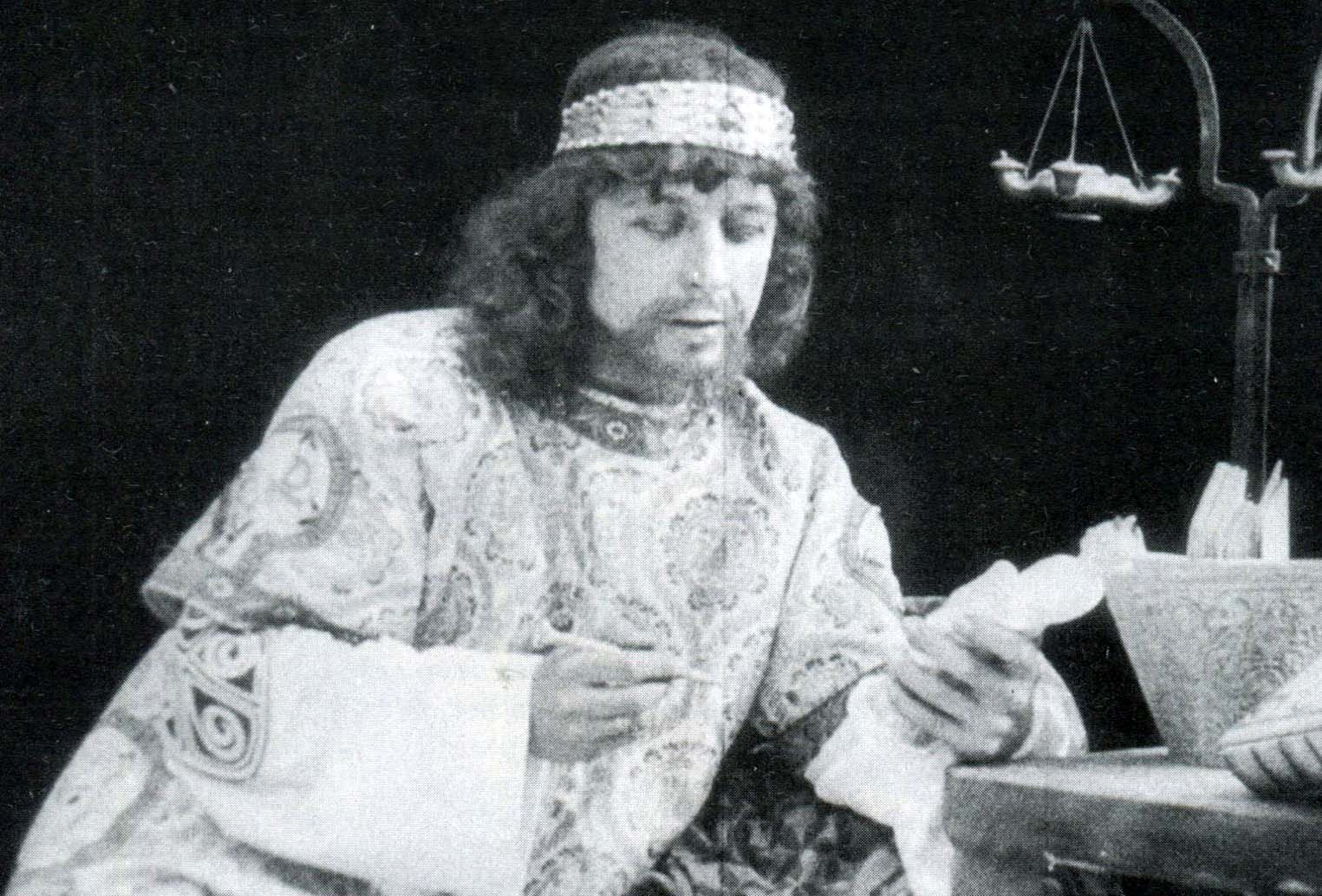
Guido Graziosi as Julian

Cast adapted from Cinematografo.

- Guido Graziosi as Julian the Apostate
- Ileana Leonidoff as Eusebia
- Silvia Malinverni as Helena
- Ignazio Mascalchi as Emperor Constantius
- Marion May as Taianus, the page
- Rina Calabria as Isa, the slave
- Filippo Ricci as Athanasius
- Claudio Caparelli as Oribasius
- Mila Bernard as Galilean

== Themes ==
Giuliano l'Apostata belongs to a trend of Italian monumental drama films from the 1910s. These films are usually set in ancient Rome, medieval Europe or during the Napoleonic Wars, and aim to express high religious and national ideals. In Giuliano l'Apostata, this is done in the form of a melodrama, with a narrative built around sentimental situations that are highlighted by music.

The sympathetic portrayal of Julian plays in with contemporary Italian politics. The Italian unification had resulted in severe tension between the Italian state and the Catholic Church, leading Pope Pius IX to issue the Non Expedit, which prohibited Catholics from participating in Italian parliamentary elections. As the Italian socialist movement became more prominent, however, Catholics were gradually allowed to engage in elections to work as a counterweight, and In 1919 the Catholic Italian People's Party was founded. With these developments came an interest in Julian among intellectuals, who treated him as a symbol for the confrontation between church and state. It is unlikely that the filmmakers intended Giuliano l'Apostata as a political manifesto, but the sympathetic portrayal aligns with the views of Gaetano Negri, a moderate right-wing representative, who presented Julian's religion as a "Christianised Paganism"; a pagan denomination that was based on the examples of the Christian church.

== Production ==
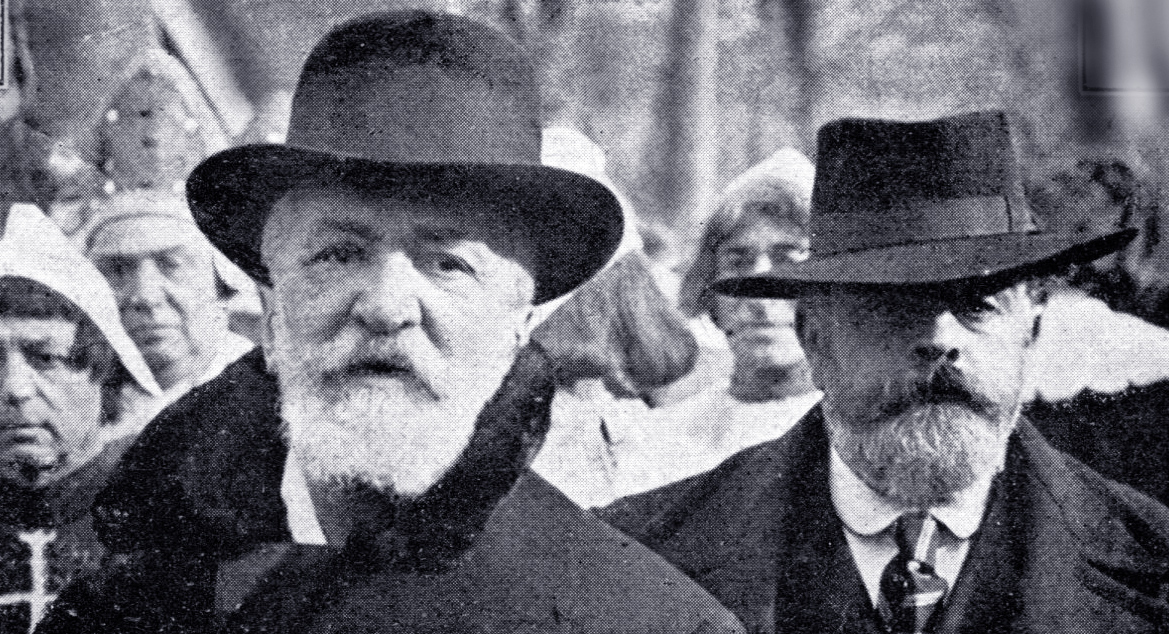
Luigi Mancinelli and Duilio Cambellotti at the set of the film

Giuliano l'Apostata was produced by Bernini Film and directed by the company's general manager, Ugo Falena. Falena was best known for his film adaptations of theatrical works, especially operas. Like many of his other works, Giuliano l'Apostata is connected to the musical world, and it was written in close collaboration with the composer Luigi Mancinelli. The screenplay took some inspiration from the 1901 book Julian the Apostate (Italian: L'imperatore Giuliano l'Apostata: studio storico) by Negri. The screenwriters used artistic license in various ways; for example, the real Eusebia died before Constantius, who remarried after her death. The reliance on an original musical score and the handling of credits and captions follow the model for large-scale peplum films that had been established with Giovanni Pastrone's and Gabriele D'Annunzio's Cabiria from 1914. Going further than Ildebrando Pizzetti's musical score for Cabiria, Mancinelli's composition for Giuliano l'Apostata includes some instances where captions from the film are sung by a soprano or a choir.

The sets and costumes were created by Duilio Cambellotti, who was Italy's most famous Art Nouveau artist and first had collaborated with Falena in 1906. Some of the inspiration for his designs came from ancient mosaics in Ravenna. Some of the image compositions and actor postures were inspired by 19th-century representations of the ancient world by painters such as Lawrence Alma-Tadema, John William Godward and Dante Gabriel Rossetti.

== Reception ==
Angelo Piccioli of the magazine Apollon complimented Falena for his sensitivity, ability to make the main character come alive, and for the visual richness of the film, but criticised the early and late parts of the film for lacking in dramatic exposition. The film did not become popular in Italy and was not distributed abroad. It has received little attention from audiences and scholars over time. The Cineteca Nazionale made a restoration in 1990.

== See also ==
- Christianity in the 4th century
- Restoration and tolerance of Paganism from Julian until Valens
