= Salomè (1910 film) =

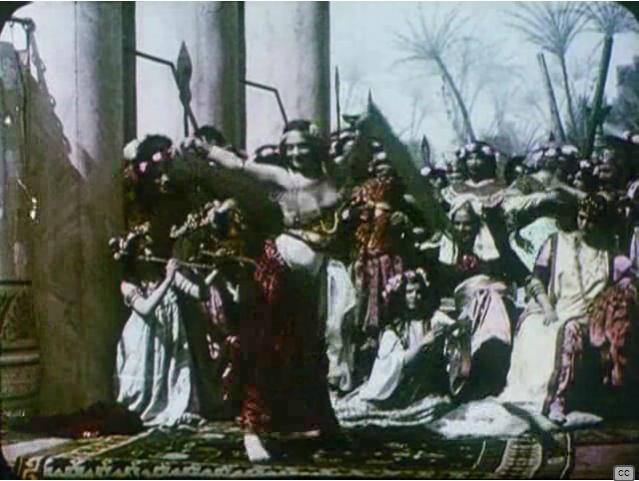
- Screenshot from the film
- Directed by: Ugo Falena
- Starring: Vittoria Lepanto; Laura Orette; Ciro Galvani; Achille Vitti; Francesca Bertini
- Release date: July 1910
- Country: Italy
- Language: Italian

Video of the film

Salomè (also known as Salome) is a 1910 Italian short film directed and produced by Ugo Falena. The film stars Vittoria Lepanto, Laura Orette and Ciro Galvani in the lead roles.

== Cast ==
- Vittoria Lepanto as Salomé
- Laura Orette as Erodiade
- Ciro Galvani as Johannes
- Achille Vitti as Tetrarch
- Francesca Bertini
- Gastone Monaldi
