= Theurgy =

Magic used to invoke divine presence

Theurgy (/ˈθiːɜːrdʒi/; Ancient Greek: θεουργία, theourgía), also known as divine magic, is one of two major branches of the magical arts, the other being practical magic or thaumaturgy. Theurgy describes the ritual practices associated with the invocation or evocation of the presence of one or more deities, especially with the goal of achieving henosis (uniting with the divine) and perfecting oneself.

== Definitions ==
- Proclus (c. 480): theurgy is "a power higher than all human wisdom embracing the blessings of divination, the purifying powers of initiation and in a word all the operations of divine possession."
- Keith Thomas: "Spiritual magic or theurgy was based on the idea that one could reach God in an ascent up the scale of creation made possible by a rigorous course of prayer, fasting and devotional preparation."
- Pierre A. Riffard: "Theurgy is a type of magic. It consists of a set of magical practices performed to evoke beneficent spirits in order to see them or know them or in order to influence them, for instance by forcing them to animate a statue, to inhabit a human being (such as a medium), or to disclose mysteries."

== Neoplatonism ==
Theurgy means "divine working". The first recorded use of the term is found in the mid-second-century neoplatonist work the Chaldean Oracles (Fragment 153 des Places (Paris, 1971): 'For the theourgoí do not fall under the fate-governed herd'). The source of Western theurgy can be found in the philosophy of late neoplatonists, especially Iamblichus. Although the neoplatonists are often considered pagan polytheists, they embraced a form of monism.

In late neoplatonism, the spiritual universe is regarded as a series of emanations from the One. From the One emanated the Divine Mind (Nous) and in turn from the Divine Mind emanated the World Soul (Psyche). Neoplatonists insisted that the One is absolutely transcendent and in the emanations nothing of the higher was lost or transmitted to the lower, which remained unchanged by the lower emanations.

For Plotinus and Porphyry the emanations are as follows:

- To Hen (τὸ ἕν), The One: Deity without quality, sometimes called The Good.
- Nous (Νοῦς), Mind: The universal consciousness, from which proceeds
- Psychē (Ψυχή), Soul: Including both individual and world soul, leading finally to
- Physis (Φύσις), Nature.

Plotinus urged contemplations for those who wished to perform theurgy, the goal of which was to reunite with the Divine (called henosis). Therefore, his school resembles a school of meditation or contemplation.

=== Iamblichus ===
Iamblichus, a student of Anatolius and associate of Porphyry (who had studied under Plotinus), developed a more elaborate and ritual-centered form of theurgy. His system emphasized invocation, ritual action, and the use of symbolic materials to engage the divine. In his major work, On the Mysteries of the Egyptians, Chaldeans, and Assyrians, Iamblichus described theurgy as a kind of ritualized cosmogony—a reenactment of the divine creative process—through which the embodied soul participates in the maintenance and restoration of cosmic order.

Iamblichus' analysis was that the transcendent cannot be grasped with mental contemplation because the transcendent is supra-rational. Theurgy is a series of rituals and operations aimed at recovering the transcendent essence by retracing the divine 'signatures' through the layers of being. Education is important for comprehending the scheme of things as presented by Aristotle, Plato, and Pythagoras. The theurgist works 'like with like': at the material level, with physical symbols; at the higher level, with mental and purely spiritual practices. Starting with correspondences of the divine in matter, the theurgist eventually reaches the level where the soul's inner divinity unites with the One.

=== Emperor Julian ===
The Emperor Julian (332-363) embraced neoplatonic philosophy and worked to replace Christianity with a version of neoplatonic paganism. Because of his untimely death and the hold mainstream Christianity had over the empire at the time, this was ultimately unsuccessful, but he did produce several works of philosophy and theology, including a popular hymn to the sun. In his theology, Helios, the sun, was the ideal example of the perfection of the gods and light, a symbol of divine emanation. He also held the mother goddess Cybele in high esteem.

Julian favored ritual theurgy, with an emphasis on sacrifice and prayer. He was heavily influenced by Iamblichus' ideas.

== In Western esotericism ==
=== Esoteric Christianity ===
Esoteric Christianity accepts theurgy as a tradition that could greatly benefit a person. The main feat of Esoteric Christianity is to learn the mysteries of God (see Raziel) and to rise to higher consciousness in the understanding of God's relationship to individual consciousness. Theurgy, in the esoteric tradition, uses this knowledge to heighten one's own spiritual nature. Some branches of Esoteric Christianity hold that if an Esoteric Christian, Rosicrucian, or Theosopher practices it they could potentially rise to the degree of Magus or Adept after a certain level of spiritual attainment. In a traditional and magical sense, theurgy is seen as the opposite of Goetia, even though many argue that they overlap.

==== Radical orthodoxy ====
John Milbank, founder of radical orthodoxy, asserts that theology "encourages a theurgy which aims at a liberation of nature from terror and distress and at a fully harmonious and beautiful interaction between humans and the natural world". He continues by stating that theology equally "encourages a theurgy which is a social work of maximising democratic participation and socialist sharing".

=== Hermetic Order of the Golden Dawn ===
Some organizations, such as the Hermetic Order of the Golden Dawn, teach a type of theurgy that would help one ascend spiritually as well as understand the true nature of the self and its relation to the Divine and the Universe. This tradition holds that theurgists are usually solitary practitioners who seek the divine light alone. Theurgy in this hermetic sense stresses the need for the individual to separate and analyze the individual components that constitute everyday consciousness and reunite them in a way that changes one's personal awareness into a state that understands and partakes in spiritual grace.

== See also ==
- Left-hand path and right-hand path – Dichotomy between two opposing approaches to magic
- Astral religion – Worship of stars and other heavenly bodies as deities
- Body of light – Hermetic starfire body
- Deity yoga – Vajrayana practice involving visualization of a deity
- Divinization – Transforming effect of divine grace
- Holy Guardian Angel – Angel assigned to protect and guide a particular person
- Pseudo-Dionysius the Areopagite – Christian apophatic theologian
- Simiyya – Doctrine of Sufism
- Theosis – Likeness to or union with God
