= Reply to Porphyry =

Theosophic-theurgic tractate attributed to Iamblichus

The Reply to Porphyry, also known under its abbreviated Latin title De Mysteriis Aegyptiorum (On the Egyptian Mysteries; or often simply De Mysteriis), is a work of Neoplatonic philosophy primarily concerned with ritual and theurgy and attributed to Iamblichus.

Porphyry is known to have had a disagreement with Iamblichus over the practice of theurgy, and the Reply to Porphyry consists mainly of Iamblichus' responses to the criticisms of his teacher.

== Title ==
The full original title of the treatise is "Reply of Master Abamon to Porphyry's Letter to Anebo, and Solutions to the Difficulties Contained Therein" (in Greek: Ἀβάμωνος διδασκάλου πρὸς τὴν Πορφυρίου πρὸς Ἀνεβὼ ἐπιστολὴν ἀπόκρισις καὶ τῶν ἐν αὐτῇ ἀπορημάτων λύσεις). The humanist Marsilio Ficino, who was the first to study the text in modern times and wrote an extensive set of notes on it, renamed it "On the Mysteries of the Egyptians, Chaldeans, and Assyrians" (in Latin: De mysteriis Aegyptiorum, Chaldaeorum, Assyriorum); Ficinus' paraphrase was published (Venice 1497) by the editor Aldo Manuzio under this title, and Iamblichus' treatise was mostly referred to with this name or its abbreviated form De mysteriis Aegyptiorum or simply De mysteriis in the subsequent centuries. The history of the title has been studied by the most recent editors of the treatise, Henry-Dominique Saffrey, Alain-Philippe Segonds and Adrien Lecerf; since the traditional title relies on no manuscript authority, they have reverted to the original title (abbreviated as "Réponse à Porphyre", Reply to Porphyry). The latter or its abbreviated form are adopted also in other standard reference works on the subject, like the entry on Iamblichus in the Stanford Encyclopedia of Philosophy.

== Authorship ==
The work presents itself as the "Reply of Master Abamon to Porphyry's Letter to Anebo". However, according to an anonymous scholion, contained in the two most important manuscripts of the work and ascribed to the byzantine writer Michael Psellos by Martin Sicherl [de], Proclus stated in his commentary on Plotinus' Enneads that the author of the treatise was Iamblichus, who hid himself under the name of Master Abamon. While, starting from the 18th century, some doubts were raised about its authorship, the attribution to Iamblichus is nowadays widely accepted by scholars, including the most recent editors.

In its systematic attempt to give a speculative justification of the polytheistic cult practices of the day, the treatise marks a turning-point in the history of thought where Iamblichus stood.

== Contents ==
There are 10 books in the work, of which the longest are Books 1 and 3. The contents of the books are.

- Book I: The soul and the gods
- Book II: Epiphanies
- Book III: Mantic ritual
- Book IV: Justice
- Book V: The nature of sacrifice
- Book VI: The process and effects of sacrifice
- Book VII: Egyptian symbolism
- Book VIII: Egyptian theology
- Book IX: The personal daemon (spirit)
- Book X: Conclusion

== See also ==
- Chaldean Oracles
- Enneads

== Editions ==
- De mysteriis Aegyptiorum (in Ancient Greek). Venice: Aldus Manutius. 1497. Archived from the original on 2009-01-07.
- De mysteriis Aegyptiorum, Chaldaeorum, Assyriorum ... proclus ... Porphyrius ... Psellus, etc... (in Latin). J. Tornesius. 1570.
- Iamblichus on the Mysteries of the Egyptians, Chaldeans, and Assyrians. Translated by Taylor, Thomas. C. Whittingham. 1821. ISBN 978-0-608-37154-2.
- Wilder, Alexander (1911). Theurgia, Or, The Egyptian Mysteries: Reply of Abammon, the Teacher, to the Letter of Porphyry to Anebo, Together with Solutions of the Questions Therein Contained. William Rider & Son, Limited.
- Iamblichus' De mysteriis: a manifesto of the miraculous. Translated by Clarke, Emma; Dillon, John M.; Hershbell, Jackson P. Society of Biblical Lit. 2003. ISBN 978-1-58983-058-5.
- Réponse à Porphyre (De Mysteriis). Texte établi, traduit et annoté par Henri-Dominique Saffrey et Alain Philippe Segonds, avec la collabiration de Adrien Lecerf. Paris: Les Belles Lettres. 2013. ISBN 9782251005805.
