= Lucrezia Borgia (1912 film) =

- Directed by: Gerolamo Lo Savio
- Written by: Ugo Falena
- Starring: Francesca Bertini
- Production company: Film d'Arte Italiana
- Distributed by: Pathé Frères
- Release date: 1912
- Country: Italy
- Languages: Silent; Italian intertitles

Lucrezia Borgia is a 1912 Italian silent historical film directed by Gerolamo Lo Savio and starring Vittoria Lepanto in the title role of Lucrezia Borgia.

== Cast ==
- Vittoria Lepanto: Lucrezia Borgia
- Achille Vitti
- Gustavo Serena
- Giovanni Pezzinga: Cesare Borgia

== Bibliography ==
- Vito Attolini. Immagini del Medioevo nel cinema. EDIZIONI DEDALO, 1993.
