= Anatolius of Laodicea =

Bishop of Laodicea in the third century

Saint Anatolius of Laodicea

Bishop and Confessor
- Born: Early 3rd century Alexandria, Roman Egypt
- Died: July 3, 283; Laodicea, Roman Syria (now Latakia, Syria)
- Venerated in: Catholic Church
- Canonized: Pre-Congregation
- Feast: 3 July
- Attributes: Cross, square
- Patronage: Teachers; mathematicians; philosophers; mystics; Latakia; Syria; Alexandria; Egypt
- Controversy
- Scientific career
- Fields: Mathematics
- Academic advisors: Diophantus (possibly)
- Notable students: Iamblichus

Anatolius of Laodicea (Greek: Ἀνατόλιος Λαοδικείας; early 3rd century – July 3, 283), also known as Anatolius of Alexandria, was a Syro-Egyptian mathematician and Bishop of Laodicea on the Mediterranean coast of Roman Syria in AD 268. He was not only one of the foremost scholars of his day in the physical sciences, as well as in Aristotelian and Platonic philosophies, but also a renowned computist and teacher of the Neoplatonic philosopher Iamblichus.

Anatolius is recognised as a saint by the Roman Catholic Church. His feast day, like Saint Anatolius of Constantinople, is celebrated on 3 July.

== Life ==
Anatolius was born and raised in Alexandria, Egypt, during the early 3rd century. Prior to becoming one of the great lights of the Church, Anatolius enjoyed considerable prestige at Alexandria while working as a senator. According to Eusebius of Caesarea, he was credited with a rich knowledge of arithmetic, geometry, physics, rhetoric, dialectic, and astronomy. Eusebius states that Anatolius was deemed worthy to maintain the school of the Aristotelian succession in Alexandria. The pagan philosopher Iamblichus also studied among his disciples.

There are fragments of ten books on arithmetic written by him; it's a mostly complete work known to us by the name Introduction to Arithmetic. This work seems to have been copied by the author of the curious writing entitled Theologoumena arithmetica, a Neoplatonic treatise heavily influenced by Pythagoreanism, uncertainly attributed to Iamblichus ─ though not written in his style, it is a discussion of each of the first ten natural numerals that mixes accounts of formal arithmetical properties with mystical philosophical analysis.

The character of its writing may be illustrated by the following quotation from it attributed to Anatolius: "[Four] is called the "just number", due to the square being equal to its perimeter (i.e 4x4 = 4+4+4+4); of the numbers lesser than four, the perimeter of the square is greater than the area, while of those greater, the perimeter is lesser than the area."

There is also a treatise on time of the Paschal celebration. His famous 19-year Paschal cycle has survived in seven different complete medieval manuscripts of the Latin text De ratione paschali.

A story is told by Eusebius of the way in which Anatolius broke up a rebellion in a part of Alexandria known then as Bruchium. It was held by the forces of Zenobia, and being strictly beleaguered by the Romans was in a state of starvation. Anatolius, who was living in Bruchium at the time, made arrangements with the besiegers to receive all the women and children, as well as the elderly, continuing at the same time to let as many as wished profit by the means of escaping. It broke up the defence and the rebels surrendered.

In going to Laodicea he was welcomed by the people and made bishop. Whether his friend Eusebius had died, or whether they both occupied the see together, is a matter of much discussion. The question is treated at length in the Bollandists.

== Anatolius as the pioneer for the mainstream medieval computus ==
Around AD 260 Anatolius invented the first Metonic 19-year lunar cycle (which 19-year periodic sequence of dates of the Paschal full moon must not be confused with the Metonic cycle, of which it is an application in the Julian calendar). Therefore, Anatolius can be considered to be the founder of the new Alexandrian computus paschalis which half a century after began with the active construction of the second version of the Metonic 19-year lunar cycle, which itself or a close variant of which ultimately would prevail throughout Christendom for a long time (until the year 1582, when the Julian calendar was replaced with the Gregorian calendar). The seventeen-centuries-old enigma of his famous 19-year Paschal cycle (not to be confused with the Paschal cycle of the Eastern Orthodox Church) was recently completely resolved by the Irish scholars Daniel Mc Carthy and Aidan Breen.

The dates of the ultimately resulting classical Alexandrian 19-year lunar cycle have recently appeared to be advanced by about two days over the dates of Anatolius’ 19-year lunar cycle. The former began somewhere in the 4th century, as evidenced by Ethiopic copies of Alexandrian tables covering three lunar cycles from 310/11 to 367/68. (Note: Neugebauer transcribed seven of 58 years with 19 parameters each, including the lunar cycle, e (epact). e = 25 6 17 28 9 20 1 for Diocletian years 44–50. These seven of the available 59 were transcribed because they are also the first seven in the festal letters of Athanasius, which also include the same [Alexandrian–Julian] epacts (they are years 6–12 of the Alexandrian lunar cycle).) The dates are secured by the inclusion of an indiction column, and the included Easter dates are consistent with the later dates of Dionysius Exiguus and Bede. The classical Alexandrian 19-year lunar cycle itself or a close variant of it was added to the festal letters of Athanasius during the late 4th century; it was used by Annianus in his 532-year tables during the early 5th century, was fully enumerated in the subsequent 532-year Ethiopic tables, and was adopted by bishop Cyril of Alexandria (without any mention of a 532-year table).

However, the Metonic 19-year lunar cycle which was added to Athanasius’ Festal Letters was a one which had 6 April instead of 5 April. Furthermore, Otto Neugebauer (1899-1990), according to himself, was in the dark about the date of compilation of the whole 7980-year framework (based on the classical Alexandrian 19-year lunar cycle) created by Alexandrian computists. Considering that only around AD 400 Annianus obtained his classical Alexandrian version of the Metonic 19-year lunar cycle by adapting Theophilus’ 19-year lunar cycle by moving its saltus 1 year forward by replacing its date 6 April by 5 April, the Catholic Encyclopedia concludes that the compilation in question dates from the fifth century. Of course, this does not exclude that the (in principle tentative) version constructed in the first quarter of the fourth century could be, by chance, equal to Annianus’ ultimately definitive one. In any case, this possible equality cannot be assured in the way Neugebauer tried to prove it, because the particular Metonic 19-year lunar cycle of the not-dated manuscript concerning AD 311-369 he staged, could have been obtained afterwards by simply extrapolating from the fifth century 7980-year framework. Moreover, Neugebauer not only ignored the difference between the classical Alexandrian and the Festal Index 19-year lunar cycle, but also kept us guessing about, at least refrained from showing, the (crucial) position of the saltus in the particular Metonic 19-year lunar cycle in question.

Anatolius describes the vernal equinox as a section of the first zodiacal sign from March 22 to 25. Although he defines March 22 as the Sun's entry into the first sign, he never defines it as his equinox, but as Ptolemy's equinox. (Note: Ptolemy measured his equinox to be on March 22 during AD 140 although modern calculations reveal it occurred on March 21 at 14:16 UT. In AD 260, it occurred on March 20 at 15:52 UT. Modern calculations are according to IMCCE at the Paris Observatory.) This does not exclude that in reality he used Ptolemy's equinox as the theoretical lower limit date for all of his dates of Paschal full moon. As a matter of fact, the corresponding de facto lower limit date (necessarily being either 22 or 23 March) is not 22 but 23 March, which easily can be derived from Anatolius’ Paschal table. In contrast, he used not only Ptolemy's but also the Roman equinox, March 25, in his Paschal table.

== Sources ==
- Acta Sanctorum I (5th century) July
- Georges Declercq (2000) Anno Domini (the Origins of the Christian Era): Turnhout (ISBN 9782503510507)
- Michaud Frères (1811–1855) Biographie universelle: Paris
- "Index, A Chronological and Synoptical", The Festal Epistles of S. Athanasius, A Library of Fathers of the Holy Catholic Church, anterior to the division of the East and West, translated by Burgess, Henry, Oxford, 1854
- Jones, Charles W. (1943), "Development of the Latin Ecclesiastical Calendar", Bedae Opera de Temporibus, Medieval Academy of America, pp. 1–122
- Lives of the Saints, Omer Englebert, New York: Barnes & Noble, 1994, pp 532, ISBN 1-56619-516-0 (casebound)
- Daniel P. Mc Carthy & Aidan Breen (2003), The ante-Nicene Christian Pasch De ratione paschali (The Paschal tract of Anatolius, bishop of Laodicea): Dublin (ISBN 9781851826971)
- Alden A. Mosshammer (2008), The Easter Computus and the Origins of the Christian Era: Oxford (ISBN 9780199543120)
- Neugebauer, Otto (2016) [1979], Ethiopic Astronomy and Computus (Red Sea Press ed.), Red Sea Press, ISBN 978-1-56902-440-9. The numbers on the pages of this edition are six less than the numbers of the corresponding pages of the original edition (1979), so six must be subtracted from page references in this edition's index and text.
- Nothaft, C. Philipp E. (2011). Dating the Passion: The Life of Jesus and the Emergence of Scientific Chronology (200–1600), Brill. (ISBN 978-90-04-21707-2).
- Philip Schaff (1892) Athanasius (Select Works and Letters): New York
- Zuidhoek, Jan (2017). "The initial year of De ratione paschali and the relevance of its paschal dates". Late Antique Calendrical Thought and its Reception in the Early Middle Ages. Studia Traditionis Theologiae. Vol. 26. Brepols Publishers. pp. 71–93. doi:10.1484/M.STT-EB.5.114734. ISBN 978-2-503-57709-8.
- The following concerns only the part "Life" of this article:
