= Chaldean Oracles =

Spiritual and philosophical texts used by Neoplatonist philosophers

The Chaldean Oracles (Ancient Greek: τὰ ἱερὰ λόγια, lit. 'the sacred oracles'), also known as the Magical Oracles (Ancient Greek: τὰ μαγικὰ λόγια) due to Plethon attributing them to Zoroaster, or just simply the Oracles (Ancient Greek: τὰ λόγια), are a set of spiritual and philosophical texts widely used by Neoplatonist philosophers from the 3rd to the 6th century CE. While the original texts have been lost, they have survived in the form of fragments consisting mainly of quotes and commentary by Neoplatonist writers. They were likely to have originally formed a single mystery-poem, which may have been in part compiled, in part in trance, by Julian the Chaldean, or more likely, his son, Julian the Theurgist in the 2nd century CE. Later Neoplatonists, such as Iamblichus and Proclus, rated them highly. The 4th-century emperor Julian (not to be confused with Julian the Chaldean or Julian the Theurgist) suggests in his Hymn to the Magna Mater that he was an initiate of the God of the Seven Rays, and was an adept of its teachings. When Christian Church Fathers or other Late Antiquity writers credit "the Chaldeans", they are probably referring to this tradition.

The Chaldean Oracles show an affinity with gnostic teachings of their time. They describe the transcendent First Paternal Intellect which includes the mediating World-Soul, a female Power (Hecate) similar to Sophia. Fiery emanations from the First Intellect produce the Second Intellect, the Demiurge, who comprehends the cosmos as well as himself, and creates Matter (ὕλη, hylē). Farthest from the Highest God (First Father / Intellect) is a dense shell of matter from which the enlightened soul must emerge, shedding its bodily garments. A combination of ascetic conduct and correct ritual are recommended to free the soul from the confines of matter, and to defend it against the demonic powers lurking in the realms between Gods and mortals.

== Origin ==
The exact origins of the Chaldean Oracles are unknown, but are usually attributed to Julian the Theurgist and/or his father, Julian the Chaldean. Chaldea is the classical Greek term for Babylon, transliterating Assyrian Kaldū, which referred to an area southeast of Babylonia near the Persian Gulf. It is not known whether Julian the Chaldean was actually of Eastern descent, or whether the term "Chaldean" had by his time come to mean "magician" or practitioner of mysterious arts.

His son, Julian the Theurgist, served in the Roman army during Marcus Aurelius' campaign against the Quadi. Julian claimed to have saved the Roman camp from a severe drought by causing a rainstorm. At least four other religious groups also claimed credit for this rainstorm. The circumstances surrounding the writing of the Oracles are also mysterious, the most likely explanation being that Julian uttered them in poetic stanzas during a trance, suggesting divine inspiration. No original documents containing the Oracles are extant, and what we know of the text has been reconstructed from fragments and quotes by later neoplatonist philosophers, as well as Christian philosophers influenced by Platonism. Neoplatonists including Porphyry, Iamblichus, and Proclus wrote extensive commentaries on the Oracles, all lost. The most extensive surviving commentary was written by the Christian philosopher Michael Psellus in the eleventh century, useful for interpreting the surviving excerpts from the Oracles.

Whether or not they were composed by Julian himself, or whether Julian compiled them from actual Chaldean originals, the oracles are mainly a product of Hellenistic syncretism as practiced in the cultural melting-pot of Alexandria, embodying the principal features of "Chaldean philosophy". They were held in high esteem throughout Late Antiquity, and by the later followers of neoplatonism, although frequently disputed by Augustine of Hippo. Some doctrines of the Oracles have been attributed to Zoroaster.

== Importance of the Oracles ==
The Chaldean Oracles were considered to be a central text by many later neoplatonist philosophers, nearly equal in importance to Plato's Timaeus. Scholars, beginning with F. Cumont, have described the Oracles as "the Bible of the Neoplatonists".

Hellenistic civilization fused a Hellenic core of religious belief and social organization with Persian-Babylonian ("Chaldean"), Israelite and Egyptian cultures, including their mystery cults and wisdom-traditions. Hellenistic thinkers philosophized and harmonized this polyglot mythology, cult tradition, oracular utterance, and initiatory lore. The philosophy attributed to these Babylonian, Persian, and Semitic cultures was believed to preserve the most ancient traditional wisdom.

Another Alexandrian attempt to philosophize and synthesize ancient religion produced the writings attributed to Hermes Trismegistus. The Chaldean Oracles are a parallel endeavour on a smaller scale, to philosophize the wisdom of Chaldea.

== Metaphysics of the Oracles ==
The metaphysical schema of the Chaldean Oracles begins with an absolute transcendent deity called the Father, whose Power produces Intellect. This Intellect contemplates purely intellectual Forms in the realm of the Father, and dually creates and governs the material realm. This dual aspect of Intellect is the Demiurge.

The Oracles further posit a boundary between the intellectual and the material realms, personified as Hecate. As a barrier or membrane, Hecate separates the purely intellectual fire of the Father from the material fire of the cosmos, and mediates all divine influence upon the lower realm.

From Hecate is derived the World-Soul, which in turn emanates Nature, the governor of the sub-lunar realm. From Nature is derived Fate, which can enslave the baser human soul. The goal of existence is to purify the baser soul from all contact with Nature and Fate by a life of austerity and contemplation. Salvation is achieved by an ascent through the planetary spheres, casting off the various baser aspects to become pure intellect.

Beneath the Intelligible Triad of Father, Magna Mater or Hecate, and Intellect lie the three successively descending worlds, Empyrean, Ethereal, and Elemental, respectively governed by a Second, Third, and Fourth Demiurgic Intellect. An additional Elemental World is ruled by Hypezokos or Flower of Fire.

The Chaldean Oracles were first translated into English by Thomas Stanley in 1662, and popularized by Thomas Taylor in 1797 and Isaac Preston Cory in 1832. They were taken up in the 19th-century esoteric Order of the Golden Dawn, which in 1895 published Taylor's translation in William Wynn Westcott's edition under the title 'The Chaldaean Oracles of Zoroaster', as part of the Golden Dawn's 'Collectanea Hermetica' series.

== State of the text ==
The original poem has not come down to us in any connected form, and is known through quotations in the works of the neoplatonists, especially Proclus and Damascius.

Wilhelm Kroll published an edition, De oraculis Chadaicis in 1894 arranging all known fragments in order of subject with a Latin translation, and this is the basis of most later scholarly work, including the study by Hans Lewy (1956), a Greek-French edition of the Oracles by Edouard des Places in 1971 and the currently standard (though not critical) edition in Greek and English by Ruth Majercik in 1989. None of these purport to be a reconstruction of the original poem but only of the surviving fragments.

Summaries of the poem were composed by Michael Psellos, and attempts have been made to arrange the surviving fragments in accordance with these summaries: Westcott's translation (above) is an example of such an attempt. These reconstructions are not generally regarded as having scholarly value, but sometimes surface in theosophical or occult use.

== See also ==
- Nabataeans of Iraq, a term used by Arabic authors as a synonym of 'Chaldean' in (pseudo-)historical and philosophical contexts
- Nabataean Agriculture, a 10th-century Arabic work similarly attributed to the ancient Mesopotamians
