= Iamblichus =

Neoplatonist philosopher and mystic (c. 245 – c. 325)

- Imaginary depiction of Iamblichus from 1675
- Born: c. 245; Chalcis ad Belum, Coele Syria, Roman Empire
- Died: c. 325 (aged c. 80)
- Other names: Iamblichus Chalcidensis, Iamblichus of Chalcis, Iamblichus of Apamea

Education
- Academic advisors: Anatolius of Laodicea, Porphyry

Philosophical work
- Era: Ancient philosophy
- Region: Western philosophy
- School: Neoplatonism
- Notable students: Aedesius, Dexippus, Sopater of Apamea, Theodorus of Asine
- Main interests: Metaphysics, philosophical cosmology
- Notable works: Reply to Porphyry
- Notable ideas: Theurgy

Iamblichus (/aɪˈæmblɪkəs/ eye-AM-blik-əs; Ancient Greek: Ἰάμβλιχος, romanized: Iámblichos; Aramaic: 𐡉𐡌𐡋𐡊𐡅, romanized: Yamlīkū; c. 245 – c. 325) was a Syrian Arab Neoplatonic philosopher who determined a direction later taken by Neoplatonism. Iamblichus was also the biographer (or hagiographer) of the Greek mystic, philosopher, and mathematician Pythagoras. In addition to his philosophical contributions, his Protrepticus is important for the study of the sophists because it preserved about ten pages of an otherwise unknown sophist, whose name is not mentioned and who is currently known as "Anonymus Iamblichi" ("Iamblichus's Anonymous").

== Life ==
According to the Suda and Iamblichus's biographer, Eunapius, Iamblichus was born in Chalcis (later called Qinnašrīn) in Coele Syria, now in northwest Syria. Iamblichus was descended from the Emesene dynasty. He initially studied under Anatolius of Laodicea and later studied under Porphyry, a pupil of Plotinus (the founder of Neoplatonism). Iamblichus disagreed with Porphyry about theurgy, responding to his criticism of the practice in the Reply to Porphyry (also known under the non-original title De mysteriis Aegyptiorum, "On the Mysteries of the Egyptians").

He returned to Coele Syria around 304 to found a school in Apamea (near Antioch), a city known for its Neoplatonic philosophers. Iamblichus designed a curriculum for studying Plato and Aristotle, and wrote commentaries on the two which survive only in fragments. Pythagoras was his supreme authority, and he wrote the ten-volume Collection of Pythagorean Doctrines with extracts from several ancient philosophers; only the first four volumes and fragments of the fifth survive.

Iamblichus wrote the Exhortation to Philosophy in Apamea during the early fourth century. Considered a man of great culture and learning, he was renowned for his charity and self-denial and had a number of students. According to Johann Albert Fabricius, he died sometime before 333 during the reign of Constantine the Great.

== Philosophy ==
Iamblichus detailed Plotinus's Neoplatonic formal divisions, applied Pythagorean number symbolism more systematically, and (influenced by other Near East systems) interpreted Neoplatonic concepts mythically. Unlike Plotinus, who broke from Platonic tradition by positing a separate soul, Iamblichus re-affirmed the soul's embodiment in matter and believed that matter was as divine as the rest of the cosmos.

=== Cosmology and theology ===
Iamblichus placed the Monad at the head of his system, from which emanates the Nous (intellect, or demiurge) and the psyche. Plotinus represented the Nous as three stages: objective being, subjective life, and realized intellect. Iamblichus divided them into two spheres: intelligible (the objects of thought) and intellective (the domain of thought).

Iamblichus and Proclus may have introduced a third sphere between the two worlds, separating and uniting them. The identification of nous with the demiurge in the Neoplatonic tradition was adopted and developed in Christian gnosticism. Augustine of Hippo follows Plotinus, identifying the nous with logos (the creative principle) as part of the Trinity.

Iamblichus multiplied the number of divine entities according to universal mathematical theorems. He conceived of gods, angels, demons and heroes: twelve heavenly gods (whose number increases to 36 or 360), 72 other gods proceeding from them, 21 chiefs and 42 nature-gods. His divine realm extends from the Monad to material nature, where the soul descends into matter and becomes embodied in human form. These superhuman beings influence natural events and communicate knowledge about the future, and are accessible with prayers and offerings. Iamblichus posited that numbers are independent, occupying a middle realm between the limited and unlimited. He believed that nature was bound by fate, differing from divine things which are not subject to fate and turn evil and imperfection to good ends; evil was generated accidentally in the conflict between the finite and the infinite.

== Reception ==
Iamblichus was praised by his followers, and contemporaries credited him with miraculous powers. The Roman emperor Julian, not content with Eunapius's modest eulogy that Iamblichus was inferior to Porphyry only in style, regarded him as second only to Plato and said that he would give all the gold in Lydia for one of his letters. During the 15th- and 16th-century revival of interest in his philosophy, Iamblichus's name was rarely mentioned without the epithet "divine" or "most divine".

== Works ==
Only a fraction of Iamblichus's books have survived; knowledge of his system is preserved in fragments of writings preserved by Stobaeus and others: notes by his successors (especially Proclus), his five extant books and sections of his work on Pythagoreanism. The most important of his extant works is, arguably, the Reply to Porphyry (Reply of Master Abamon to Porphyry's Letter to Anebo, and Solutions to the Difficulties Contained Therein; in Greek: Ἀβάμωνος διδασκάλου πρὸς τὴν Πορφυρίου πρὸς Ἀνεβὼ ἐπιστολὴν ἀπόκρισις καὶ τῶν ἐν αὐτῇ ἀπορημάτων λύσεις), also known as De mysteriis Aegyptiorum (On the Egyptian Mysteries); in this work, which he completed under the Egyptian pseudonym Aba(m)mon, he develops a coherent polytheist theological system.

=== Editions and translations ===
- Reply to Porphyry (De mysteriis), ed. Gustav Parthey, Teubner, 1857; ed. Edouard des Places, Collection Budé, 1989; ed. (with French translation) Henry-Dominique Saffrey, Alain-Philippe Segonds, and Adrien Lecerf, Collection Budé, 2013, ISBN 9782251005805.
  - English translations: Thomas Taylor, 1821; Alexander Wilder, 1911; Emma C. Clarke, John M. Dillon, and Jackson P. Hershbell, 2003, ISBN 1-58983-058-X.
- The Life of Pythagoras
  - English translation: Thomas Taylor, 1818
- On the Pythagorean Way of Life (De vita pythagorica), ed. Theophil Kießling, Leipzig, 1816; ed. August Nauck, St. Petersburg, 1884; ed. Ludwig Deubner, Teubner, 1937 (rev. Ulrich Klein, 1975).
  - English translations: Gillian Clark, 1989, ISBN 0-85323-326-8; John M. Dillon and Jackson Hershbell, 1991, ISBN 1-55540-523-1
- On General Mathematical Science (Περὶ τῆς κοινῆς μαθηματικῆς ἐπιστήμης, De communi mathematica scientia), ed. Nicola Festa, Teubner, 1891 (reprint 1975)
  - English translations: John M. Dillon & J. O. Urmson (2021; Bloomsbury Publishing)
- Protrepticus, ed. Ermenegildo Pistelli, Teubner, 1888 (repr. 1975); ed. des Places, Budé, 1989.
  - English translation: Thomas Moore Johnson, Iamblichus' Exhortation to the Study of Philosophy, Osceola, Mo., 1907 (repr. 1988, ISBN 0-933999-63-1).
- In Nicomachi arithmeticam introductionem, Teubner, ed. Pistelli, Teubner, 1894 (rev. Klein, 1975)
- Letters: John M. Dillon and Wolfgang Polleichtner, Iamblichus of Chalcis: The Letters, 2009, ISBN 1-58983-161-6.
- John F. Finamore and John M. Dillon, Iamblichus' De Anima: Text, Translation, and Commentary, Leiden: Brill, 2002, ISBN 1-58983-468-2.
- Fragmentary commentaries on Plato
  - Bent Dalsgaard Larsen, Jamblique de Chalcis: Exégète et philosophe (vol. 2, appendix: Testimonia et fragmenta exegetica), Universitetsforlaget i Aarhus, 1972 (Greek texts only).
  - John M. Dillon (ed. and trans.), Iamblichi Chalcidensis in Platonis dialogos commentariorum fragmenta, Leiden: Brill, 1973.
- Theological Principles of Arithmetic (Theologumena arithmeticae, an anonymous work ascribed to Iamblichus or Anatolius of Laodicea), ed. Friedrich Ast, Leipzig, 1817; ed. Vittorio de Falco, Teubner, 1922.
  - English translation: Robin Waterfield, Pseudo-Iamblichus: The Theology of Arithmetic, translation, introduction, notes; foreword by K. Critchlow, Phanes Press, 1988, ISBN 0-933999-72-0.

== Bibliography ==
- Chiaradonna, Riccardo; Lecerf, Adrien. "Iamblichus". In Zalta, Edward N. (ed.). Stanford Encyclopedia of Philosophy. ISSN 1095-5054. OCLC 429049174.
- Fowden, Garth (1986). The Egyptian Hermes: A Historical Approach to the Late Pagan Mind. Princeton: Princeton University Press. (has an excellent section on Iamblichus' and the Neoplatonists' relation to the works attributed to Hermes Trismegistus)
- George, Roy (1999). "Iamblichus". Encyclopedia of the Goddess Athena.
- Hartmann, Udo (2018). Der spätantike Philosoph. Die Lebenswelten der paganen Gelehrten und ihre hagiographische Ausgestaltung in den Philosophenviten von Porphyrios bis Damaskios [The late antique philosopher. The lifeworlds of pagan scholars and their hagiographic treatment in the philosophical vitae from Porphyrius to Damascius]. 3 volumes. Bonn: Habelt, ISBN 978-3-7749-4172-4, pp. 497-544.
- Kalvesmaki, Joel. The Theology of Arithmetic: Number Symbolism in Platonism and Early Christianity. Hellenic Studies Series. Vol. 59. Washington, DC: Center for Hellenic Studies.
- Moore, Edward (2005). "'Likeness to God as Far as Possible': Deification Doctrine in Iamblichus and Three Eastern Christian Fathers". Theandros. 3 (1). Archived from the original on 11 June 2008.
- Shaw, Gregory (1995). Theurgy and the Soul: The Neoplatonism of Iamblichus. Pennsylvania: Pennsylvania State University Press.
- Shaw, Gregory (2006). "Neoplatonism I: Antiquity". In Hanegraaff, Wouter J. (ed.). Dictionary of Gnosis & Western Esotericism. Leiden & Boston: Brill. pp. 834–835.
- Siorvanes, Lucas (1998). "Iamblichus". Routledge – via MuslimPhilosophy.com.
