= Ugo Falena =

Italian silent film director and opera librettist

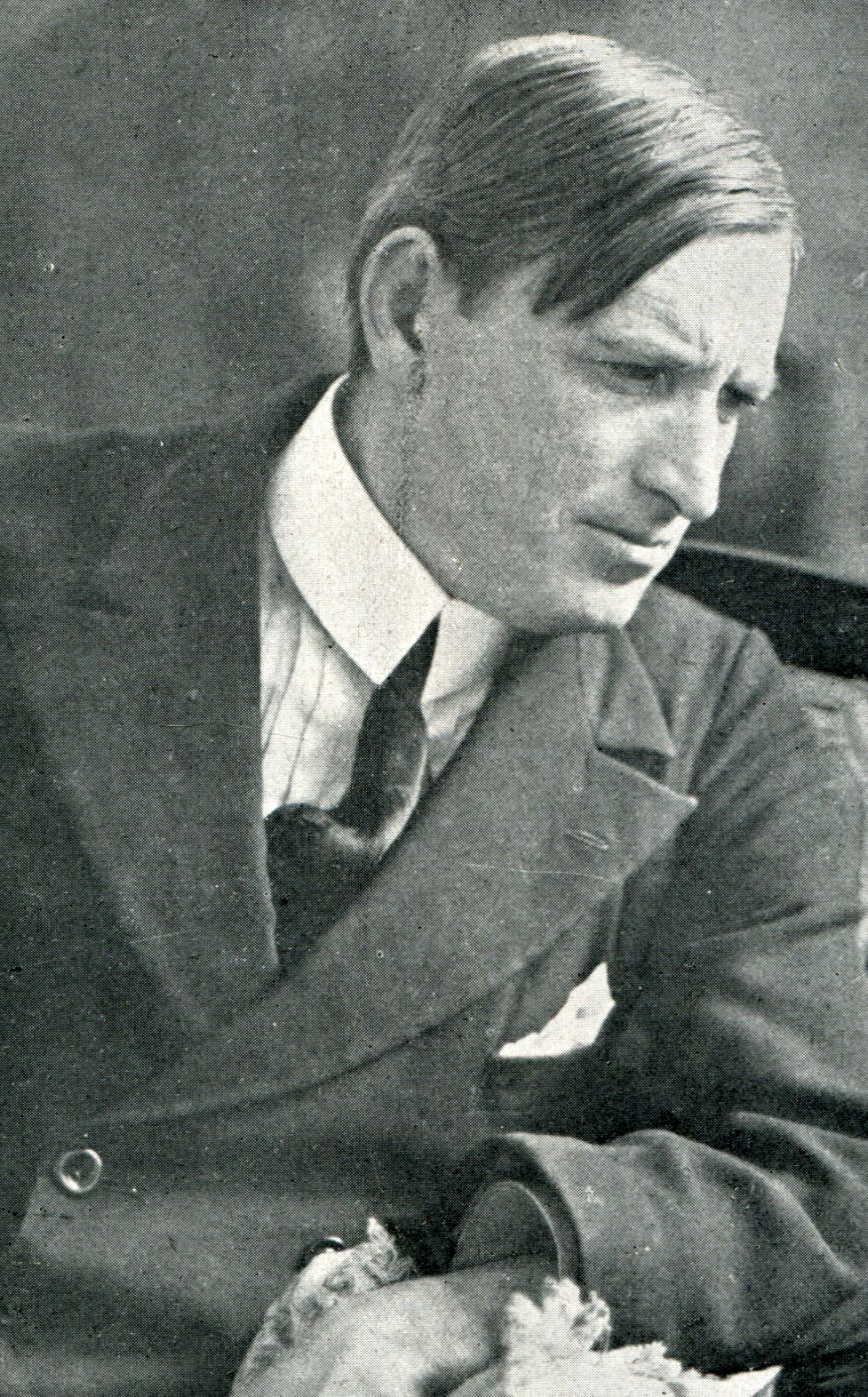
Ugo Falena

Ugo Falena (25 April 1875 in Rome – 20 September 1931 in Rome) was an Italian silent film director and occasional opera librettist. His films include Otello (1909), Beatrice Cenci (1911), William Tell (1911), Romeo and Juliet (1912), and a notable adaptation of Mascagni's Cavalleria rusticana (1916) featuring the soprano who sang at the premiere of the opera, itself, Gemma Bellincioni. He also wrote the libretto for Alfano's opera, L’ultimo Lord.

== Works ==
Romeo and Juliet (1912) (intertitles in Dutch)

- Trionfi dell'anima (1896)
- In quarantena (1897)
- Il pappagallo (The Parakeet) (1900)
- Il sogno di Giacobbe (1900)
- Jolanda di Savoia (Yolande of Savoy) (1900)
- I morti (1906)
- Il passato (1907)
- Salomè (1910)
- Il Signor Principe (1911)
- Gli assenti (1914)
- L'Aquila (1916)
- Don Giovanni (1923)
- Le nozze d'Arlecchino (1924)
- Zi' Cardinale (1924)
- Er giubbileo (1925)
- Il buon ladrone (1925)
- L'ultimo lord (1925)
- La sposa del Re (1926)
- Il raggio di Luna (1927)
- La regina Pomari (1928)
- Il favorito (The Favourite) (1928)
- Santo Marino (1928)
- La vendetta di Demostene (Demosthene's Vendetta) (1930)
- L'esiliata (1930)
- Il duca di Mantova (The Duke of Mantua) (1931)
- La corona di Strass (Strass's Crown) (1931) - posthumous
- Diogene senza lanterna (1931) - posthumous

== Filmography ==
- Othello (Otello) (1909)
- La signora delle camelie (1909)
- Beatrice Cenci (1910)
- Folchetto di Narbona (1910)
- Francesca da Rimini (1910)
- Rape of the Sabines (Il ratto delle Sabine) (1910)
- Salomè (1910)
- William Tell (Guglielmo Tell) (1911)
- I promessi sposi (1911)
- Tristan and Isolde (1911)
- Marco Visconti (1911)
- Romeo and Juliet (Romeo e Giulietta) (1912)
- Un dramma a Firenze (A Drama in Florence) (1912)
- Lucrezia Borgia (1912)
- Beatrice d'Este (1912)
- La rinunzia (1913)
- Colei che si deve amare (1914)
- I nostri figli (Our Son) (1914)
- Il Giornalissimo (1914)
- Il re fantasma (The Ghost King) (1914)
- La colpa di Giovanna (1914)
- La più forte (The Most Strongest) (1914)
- Lo stratagemma di Stasià (1914)
- Rivelazione e fatalità (1914)
- Scarpine rotte (1914)
- Il disinganno di Pierrot (The Disillusion of Pierrot) (1915)
- Il fantasma della felicità (1915)
- Il sogno di Giacobbe (1915)
- La colpa di Fernanda (1915)
- Per la Patria! (1915)
- Silvio e lo stradivarius (Silvio and the Stradivarius) (1915)
- Cavalleria rusticana (1916)
- Cuore e cuori (Heart and Hearts, also Heart to Heart) (1916)
- Effetti di luce (Light Effects) (1916)
- Il birichino di Parigi (1916)
- La piccola ombra (1916)
- La laude della vita e la laude della morte (1916)
- Il figlio della guerra (The Son of War) (1916)
- La figlia di Erodiade (The Son of Herodias) (1916)
- La laude della vita e la laude della morte (1916)
- La modella (The Model) (1916)
- La pupilla (The Pupil) (1916)
- Il malefico anello (1916)
- Suor Teresa (1916)
- Anna Karenine (Anna Karenina) (1917)
- La donna che non ebbe cuore (1917)
- La figlia del mare (Daughter of the Sea) (1917)
- Lilly Pussy (1917)
- A Santa Lucia (1917)
- La tragica fine di Caligola Imperatore (Caligula) (1917)
- Le nozze di Vittoria (The Victory Night) (1917)
- Cenere e vampe (1918)
- Il ferro (The Iron) (1918)
- Lolita (1918)
- Le due Marie (The Two Marys) (1918)
- Salomé (1918)
- Adriana Lecouvreur (1919)
- Giuliano l'Apostata (Julian the Apostate) (1919)
- Il trittico dell'amore (1920)
- Il volo degli aironi (1920)
- Il piccolo santo (1920)
- Cenerentola (1920)
- Le due esistenze (The Two Existences) (1920)
- La congiura dei Fieschi (1921)
- Il natalizio della nonna (1924)

== Bibliography ==
- AA. VV. Enciclopedia dello Spettacolo, Vol 4., various editions
- AA. VV. Filmlexicon degli autori e delle opere vol. 2 - Roma, Centro sperimentale di cinematografia, 1959
- S. D'Amico Il teatro italiano - Milan, Treves, 1932
