= Lists of births by year =

This is a list of lists of births of notable people, organised by year. New births articles are added to their respective year (e.g., 2025#Births) and then the link (Births in 2025) is linked below.

== 21st century ==
=== 2020s ===
- Births in 2025
- Births in 2024
- Births in 2023
- Births in 2022
- Births in 2021
- Births in 2020

=== 2010s ===
- Births in 2019
- Births in 2018
- Births in 2017
- Births in 2016
- Births in 2015
- Births in 2014
- Births in 2013
- Births in 2012
- Births in 2011
- Births in 2010

=== 2000s ===
- Births in 2009
- Births in 2008
- Births in 2007
- Births in 2006
- Births in 2005
- Births in 2004
- Births in 2003
- Births in 2002
- Births in 2001
- Births in 2000

== 20th century ==
=== 1990s ===
- Births in 1999
- Births in 1998
- Births in 1997
- Births in 1996
- Births in 1995
- Births in 1994
- Births in 1993
- Births in 1992
- Births in 1991
- Births in 1990

=== 1980s ===
- Births in 1989
- Births in 1988
- Births in 1987
- Births in 1986
- Births in 1985
- Births in 1984
- Births in 1983
- Births in 1982
- Births in 1981
- Births in 1980

=== 1970s ===
- Births in 1979
- Births in 1978
- Births in 1977
- Births in 1976
- Births in 1975
- Births in 1974
- Births in 1973
- Births in 1972
- Births in 1971
- Births in 1970

=== 1960s ===
- Births in 1969
- Births in 1968
- Births in 1967
- Births in 1966
- Births in 1965
- Births in 1964
- Births in 1963
- Births in 1962
- Births in 1961
- Births in 1960

=== 1950s ===
- Births in 1959
- Births in 1958
- Births in 1957
- Births in 1956
- Births in 1955
- Births in 1954
- Births in 1953
- Births in 1952
- Births in 1951
- Births in 1950

=== 1940s ===
- Births in 1949
- Births in 1948
- Births in 1947
- Births in 1946
- Births in 1945
- Births in 1944
- Births in 1943
- Births in 1942
- Births in 1941
- Births in 1940

=== 1930s ===
- Births in 1939
- Births in 1938
- Births in 1937
- Births in 1936
- Births in 1935
- Births in 1934
- Births in 1933
- Births in 1932
- Births in 1931
- Births in 1930

=== 1920s ===
- Births in 1929
- Births in 1928
- Births in 1927
- Births in 1926
- Births in 1925
- Births in 1924
- Births in 1923
- Births in 1922
- Births in 1921
- Births in 1920

=== 1910s ===
- Births in 1919
- Births in 1918
- Births in 1917
- Births in 1916
- Births in 1915
- Births in 1914
- Births in 1913
- Births in 1912
- Births in 1911
- Births in 1910

=== 1900s ===
- Births in 1909
- Births in 1908
- Births in 1907
- Births in 1906
- Births in 1905
- Births in 1904
- Births in 1903
- Births in 1902
- Births in 1901
- Births in 1900

== 19th century ==
=== 1890s ===
- Births in 1899
- Births in 1898
- Births in 1897
- Births in 1896
- Births in 1895
- Births in 1894
- Births in 1893
- Births in 1892
- Births in 1891
- Births in 1890

=== 1880s ===
- Births in 1889
- Births in 1888
- Births in 1887
- Births in 1886
- Births in 1885
- Births in 1884
- Births in 1883
- Births in 1882
- Births in 1881
- Births in 1880

=== 1870s ===
- Births in 1879
- Births in 1878
- Births in 1877
- Births in 1876
- Births in 1875
- Births in 1874
- Births in 1873
- Births in 1872
- Births in 1871
- Births in 1870

=== 1860s ===
- Births in 1869
- Births in 1868
- Births in 1867
- Births in 1866
- Births in 1865
- Births in 1864
- Births in 1863
- Births in 1862
- Births in 1861
- Births in 1860

=== 1850s ===
- Births in 1859
- Births in 1858
- Births in 1857
- Births in 1856
- Births in 1855
- Births in 1854
- Births in 1853
- Births in 1852
- Births in 1851
- Births in 1850

=== 1840s ===
- Births in 1849
- Births in 1848
- Births in 1847
- Births in 1846
- Births in 1845
- Births in 1844
- Births in 1843
- Births in 1842
- Births in 1841
- Births in 1840

=== 1830s ===
- Births in 1839
- Births in 1838
- Births in 1837
- Births in 1836
- Births in 1835
- Births in 1834
- Births in 1833
- Births in 1832
- Births in 1831
- Births in 1830

=== 1820s ===
- Births in 1829
- Births in 1828
- Births in 1827
- Births in 1826
- Births in 1825
- Births in 1824
- Births in 1823
- Births in 1822
- Births in 1821
- Births in 1820

=== 1810s ===
- Births in 1819
- Births in 1818
- Births in 1817
- Births in 1816
- Births in 1815
- Births in 1814
- Births in 1813
- Births in 1812
- Births in 1811
- Births in 1810

=== 1800s ===
- Births in 1809
- Births in 1808
- Births in 1807
- Births in 1806
- Births in 1805
- Births in 1804
- Births in 1803
- Births in 1802
- Births in 1801
- Births in 1800

== 18th century ==
=== 1790s ===
- Births in 1799
- Births in 1798
- Births in 1797
- Births in 1796
- Births in 1795
- Births in 1794
- Births in 1793
- Births in 1792
- Births in 1791
- Births in 1790

=== 1780s ===
- Births in 1789
- Births in 1788
- Births in 1787
- Births in 1786
- Births in 1785
- Births in 1784
- Births in 1783
- Births in 1782
- Births in 1781
- Births in 1780

=== 1770s ===
- Births in 1779
- Births in 1778
- Births in 1777
- Births in 1776
- Births in 1775
- Births in 1774
- Births in 1773
- Births in 1772
- Births in 1771
- Births in 1770

=== 1760s ===
- Births in 1769
- Births in 1768
- Births in 1767
- Births in 1766
- Births in 1765
- Births in 1764
- Births in 1763
- Births in 1762
- Births in 1761
- Births in 1760

=== 1750s ===
- Births in 1759
- Births in 1758
- Births in 1757
- Births in 1756
- Births in 1755
- Births in 1754
- Births in 1753
- Births in 1752
- Births in 1751
- Births in 1750

=== 1740s ===
- Births in 1749
- Births in 1748
- Births in 1747
- Births in 1746
- Births in 1745
- Births in 1744
- Births in 1743
- Births in 1742
- Births in 1741
- Births in 1740

=== 1730s ===
- Births in 1739
- Births in 1738
- Births in 1737
- Births in 1736
- Births in 1735
- Births in 1734
- Births in 1733
- Births in 1732
- Births in 1731
- Births in 1730

=== 1720s ===
- Births in 1729
- Births in 1728
- Births in 1727
- Births in 1726
- Births in 1725
- Births in 1724
- Births in 1723
- Births in 1722
- Births in 1721
- Births in 1720

=== 1710s ===
- Births in 1719
- Births in 1718
- Births in 1717
- Births in 1716
- Births in 1715
- Births in 1714
- Births in 1713
- Births in 1712
- Births in 1711
- Births in 1710

=== 1700s ===
- Births in 1709
- Births in 1708
- Births in 1707
- Births in 1706
- Births in 1705
- Births in 1704
- Births in 1703
- Births in 1702
- Births in 1701
- Births in 1700

== 17th century ==
=== 1690s ===
- Births in 1699
- Births in 1698
- Births in 1697
- Births in 1696
- Births in 1695
- Births in 1694
- Births in 1693
- Births in 1692
- Births in 1691
- Births in 1690

=== 1680s ===
- Births in 1689
- Births in 1688
- Births in 1687
- Births in 1686
- Births in 1685
- Births in 1684
- Births in 1683
- Births in 1682
- Births in 1681
- Births in 1680

=== 1670s ===
- Births in 1679
- Births in 1678
- Births in 1677
- Births in 1676
- Births in 1675
- Births in 1674
- Births in 1673
- Births in 1672
- Births in 1671
- Births in 1670

=== 1660s ===
- Births in 1669
- Births in 1668
- Births in 1667
- Births in 1666
- Births in 1665
- Births in 1664
- Births in 1663
- Births in 1662
- Births in 1661
- Births in 1660

=== 1650s ===
- Births in 1659
- Births in 1658
- Births in 1657
- Births in 1656
- Births in 1655
- Births in 1654
- Births in 1653
- Births in 1652
- Births in 1651
- Births in 1650

=== 1640s ===
- Births in 1649
- Births in 1648
- Births in 1647
- Births in 1646
- Births in 1645
- Births in 1644
- Births in 1643
- Births in 1642
- Births in 1641
- Births in 1640

=== 1630s ===
- Births in 1639
- Births in 1638
- Births in 1637
- Births in 1636
- Births in 1635
- Births in 1634
- Births in 1633
- Births in 1632
- Births in 1631
- Births in 1630

=== 1620s ===
- Births in 1629
- Births in 1628
- Births in 1627
- Births in 1626
- Births in 1625
- Births in 1624
- Births in 1623
- Births in 1622
- Births in 1621
- Births in 1620

=== 1610s ===
- Births in 1619
- Births in 1618
- Births in 1617
- Births in 1616
- Births in 1615
- Births in 1614
- Births in 1613
- Births in 1612
- Births in 1611
- Births in 1610

=== 1600s ===
- Births in 1609
- Births in 1608
- Births in 1607
- Births in 1606
- Births in 1605
- Births in 1604
- Births in 1603
- Births in 1602
- Births in 1601
- Births in 1600

== 16th century ==
=== 1590s ===
- Births in 1599
- Births in 1598
- Births in 1597
- Births in 1596
- Births in 1595
- Births in 1594
- Births in 1593
- Births in 1592
- Births in 1591
- Births in 1590

=== 1580s ===
- Births in 1589
- Births in 1588
- Births in 1587
- Births in 1586
- Births in 1585
- Births in 1584
- Births in 1583
- Births in 1582
- Births in 1581
- Births in 1580

=== 1570s ===
- Births in 1579
- Births in 1578
- Births in 1577
- Births in 1576
- Births in 1575
- Births in 1574
- Births in 1573
- Births in 1572
- Births in 1571
- Births in 1570

=== 1560s ===
- Births in 1569
- Births in 1568
- Births in 1567
- Births in 1566
- Births in 1565
- Births in 1564
- Births in 1563
- Births in 1562
- Births in 1561
- Births in 1560

=== 1550s ===
- Births in 1559
- Births in 1558
- Births in 1557
- Births in 1556
- Births in 1555
- Births in 1554
- Births in 1553
- Births in 1552
- Births in 1551
- Births in 1550

=== 1540s ===
- Births in 1549
- Births in 1548
- Births in 1547
- Births in 1546
- Births in 1545
- Births in 1544
- Births in 1543
- Births in 1542
- Births in 1541
- Births in 1540

=== 1530s ===
- Births in 1539
- Births in 1538
- Births in 1537
- Births in 1536
- Births in 1535
- Births in 1534
- Births in 1533
- Births in 1532
- Births in 1531
- Births in 1530

=== 1520s ===
- Births in 1529
- Births in 1528
- Births in 1527
- Births in 1526
- Births in 1525
- Births in 1524
- Births in 1523
- Births in 1522
- Births in 1521
- Births in 1520

=== 1510s ===
- Births in 1519
- Births in 1518
- Births in 1517
- Births in 1516
- Births in 1515
- Births in 1514
- Births in 1513
- Births in 1512
- Births in 1511
- Births in 1510

=== 1500s ===
- Births in 1509
- Births in 1508
- Births in 1507
- Births in 1506
- Births in 1505
- Births in 1504
- Births in 1503
- Births in 1502
- Births in 1501
- Births in 1500

== 15th century ==
=== 1490s ===
- Births in 1499
- Births in 1498
- Births in 1497
- Births in 1496
- Births in 1495
- Births in 1494
- Births in 1493
- Births in 1492
- Births in 1491
- Births in 1490

=== 1480s ===
- Births in 1489
- Births in 1488
- Births in 1487
- Births in 1486
- Births in 1485
- Births in 1484
- Births in 1483
- Births in 1482
- Births in 1481
- Births in 1480

=== 1470s ===
- Births in 1479
- Births in 1478
- Births in 1477
- Births in 1476
- Births in 1475
- Births in 1474
- Births in 1473
- Births in 1472
- Births in 1471
- Births in 1470

=== 1460s ===
- Births in 1469
- Births in 1468
- Births in 1467
- Births in 1466
- Births in 1465
- Births in 1464
- Births in 1463
- Births in 1462
- Births in 1461
- Births in 1460

=== 1450s ===
- Births in 1459
- Births in 1458
- Births in 1457
- Births in 1456
- Births in 1455
- Births in 1454
- Births in 1453
- Births in 1452
- Births in 1451
- Births in 1450

=== 1440s ===
- Births in 1449
- Births in 1448
- Births in 1447
- Births in 1446
- Births in 1445
- Births in 1444
- Births in 1443
- Births in 1442
- Births in 1441
- Births in 1440

=== 1430s ===
- Births in 1439
- Births in 1438
- Births in 1437
- Births in 1436
- Births in 1435
- Births in 1434
- Births in 1433
- Births in 1432
- Births in 1431
- Births in 1430

=== 1420s ===
- Births in 1429
- Births in 1428
- Births in 1427
- Births in 1426
- Births in 1425
- Births in 1424
- Births in 1423
- Births in 1422
- Births in 1421
- Births in 1420

=== 1410s ===
- Births in 1419
- Births in 1418
- Births in 1417
- Births in 1416
- Births in 1415
- Births in 1414
- Births in 1413
- Births in 1412
- Births in 1411
- Births in 1410

=== 1400s ===
- Births in 1409
- Births in 1408
- Births in 1407
- Births in 1406
- Births in 1405
- Births in 1404
- Births in 1403
- Births in 1402
- Births in 1401
- Births in 1400

== 14th century ==
=== 1390s ===
- Births in 1399
- Births in 1398
- Births in 1397
- Births in 1396
- Births in 1395
- Births in 1394
- Births in 1393
- Births in 1392
- Births in 1391
- Births in 1390

=== 1380s ===
- Births in 1389
- Births in 1388
- Births in 1387
- Births in 1386
- Births in 1385
- Births in 1384
- Births in 1383
- Births in 1382
- Births in 1381
- Births in 1380

=== 1370s ===
- Births in 1379
- Births in 1378
- Births in 1377
- Births in 1376
- Births in 1375
- Births in 1374
- Births in 1373
- Births in 1372
- Births in 1371
- Births in 1370

=== 1360s ===
- Births in 1369
- Births in 1368
- Births in 1367
- Births in 1366
- Births in 1365
- Births in 1364
- Births in 1363
- Births in 1362
- Births in 1361
- Births in 1360

=== 1350s ===
- Births in 1359
- Births in 1358
- Births in 1357
- Births in 1356
- Births in 1355
- Births in 1354
- Births in 1353
- Births in 1352
- Births in 1351
- Births in 1350

=== 1340s ===
- Births in 1349
- Births in 1348
- Births in 1347
- Births in 1346
- Births in 1345
- Births in 1344
- Births in 1343
- Births in 1342
- Births in 1341
- Births in 1340

=== 1330s ===
- Births in 1339
- Births in 1338
- Births in 1337
- Births in 1336
- Births in 1335
- Births in 1334
- Births in 1333
- Births in 1332
- Births in 1331
- Births in 1330

=== 1320s ===
- Births in 1329
- Births in 1328
- Births in 1327
- Births in 1326
- Births in 1325
- Births in 1324
- Births in 1323
- Births in 1322
- Births in 1321
- Births in 1320

=== 1310s ===
- Births in 1319
- Births in 1318
- Births in 1317
- Births in 1316
- Births in 1315
- Births in 1314
- Births in 1313
- Births in 1312
- Births in 1311
- Births in 1310

=== 1300s ===
- Births in 1309
- Births in 1308
- Births in 1307
- Births in 1306
- Births in 1305
- Births in 1304
- Births in 1303
- Births in 1302
- Births in 1301
- Births in 1300

== 13th century ==
=== 1290s ===
- Births in 1299
- Births in 1298
- Births in 1297
- Births in 1296
- Births in 1295
- Births in 1294
- Births in 1293
- Births in 1292
- Births in 1291
- Births in 1290

=== 1280s ===
- Births in 1289
- Births in 1288
- Births in 1287
- Births in 1286
- Births in 1285
- Births in 1284
- Births in 1283
- Births in 1282
- Births in 1281
- Births in 1280

=== 1270s ===
- Births in 1279
- Births in 1278
- Births in 1277
- Births in 1276
- Births in 1275
- Births in 1274
- Births in 1273
- Births in 1272
- Births in 1271
- Births in 1270

=== 1260s ===
- Births in 1269
- Births in 1268
- Births in 1267
- Births in 1266
- Births in 1265
- Births in 1264
- Births in 1263
- Births in 1262
- Births in 1261
- Births in 1260

=== 1250s ===
- Births in 1259
- Births in 1258
- Births in 1257
- Births in 1256
- Births in 1255
- Births in 1254
- Births in 1253
- Births in 1252
- Births in 1251
- Births in 1250

=== 1240s ===
- Births in 1249
- Births in 1248
- Births in 1247
- Births in 1246
- Births in 1245
- Births in 1244
- Births in 1243
- Births in 1242
- Births in 1241
- Births in 1240

=== 1230s ===
- Births in 1239
- Births in 1238
- Births in 1237
- Births in 1236
- Births in 1235
- Births in 1234
- Births in 1233
- Births in 1232
- Births in 1231
- Births in 1230

=== 1220s ===
- Births in 1229
- Births in 1228
- Births in 1227
- Births in 1226
- Births in 1225
- Births in 1224
- Births in 1223
- Births in 1222
- Births in 1221
- Births in 1220

=== 1210s ===
- Births in 1219
- Births in 1218
- Births in 1217
- Births in 1216
- Births in 1215
- Births in 1214
- Births in 1213
- Births in 1212
- Births in 1211
- Births in 1210

=== 1200s ===
- Births in 1209
- Births in 1208
- Births in 1207
- Births in 1206
- Births in 1205
- Births in 1204
- Births in 1203
- Births in 1202
- Births in 1201
- Births in 1200

== 12th century ==
=== 1190s ===
- Births in 1199
- Births in 1198
- Births in 1197
- Births in 1196
- Births in 1195
- Births in 1194
- Births in 1193
- Births in 1192
- Births in 1191
- Births in 1190

=== 1180s ===
- Births in 1189
- Births in 1188
- Births in 1187
- Births in 1186
- Births in 1185
- Births in 1184
- Births in 1183
- Births in 1182
- Births in 1181
- Births in 1180

=== 1170s ===
- Births in 1179
- Births in 1178
- Births in 1177
- Births in 1176
- Births in 1175
- Births in 1174
- Births in 1173
- Births in 1172
- Births in 1171
- Births in 1170

=== 1160s ===
- Births in 1169
- Births in 1168
- Births in 1167
- Births in 1166
- Births in 1165
- Births in 1164
- Births in 1163
- Births in 1162
- Births in 1161
- Births in 1160

=== 1150s ===
- Births in 1159
- Births in 1158
- Births in 1157
- Births in 1156
- Births in 1155
- Births in 1154
- Births in 1153
- Births in 1152
- Births in 1151
- Births in 1150

=== 1140s ===
- Births in 1149
- Births in 1148
- Births in 1147
- Births in 1146
- Births in 1145
- Births in 1144
- Births in 1143
- Births in 1142
- Births in 1141
- Births in 1140

=== 1130s ===
- Births in 1139
- Births in 1138
- Births in 1137
- Births in 1136
- Births in 1135
- Births in 1134
- Births in 1133
- Births in 1132
- Births in 1131
- Births in 1130

=== 1120s ===
- Births in 1129
- Births in 1128
- Births in 1127
- Births in 1126
- Births in 1125
- Births in 1124
- Births in 1123
- Births in 1122
- Births in 1121
- Births in 1120

=== 1110s ===
- Births in 1119
- Births in 1118
- Births in 1117
- Births in 1116
- Births in 1115
- Births in 1114
- Births in 1113
- Births in 1112
- Births in 1111
- Births in 1110

=== 1100s ===
- Births in 1109
- Births in 1108
- Births in 1107
- Births in 1106
- Births in 1105
- Births in 1104
- Births in 1103
- Births in 1102
- Births in 1101
- Births in 1100

== 11th century ==
=== 1090s ===
- Births in 1099
- Births in 1098
- Births in 1097
- Births in 1096
- Births in 1095
- Births in 1094
- Births in 1093
- Births in 1092
- Births in 1091
- Births in 1090

=== 1080s ===
- Births in 1089
- Births in 1088
- Births in 1087
- Births in 1086
- Births in 1085
- Births in 1084
- Births in 1083
- Births in 1082
- Births in 1081
- Births in 1080

=== 1070s ===
- Births in 1079
- Births in 1078
- Births in 1077
- Births in 1076
- Births in 1075
- Births in 1074
- Births in 1073
- Births in 1072
- Births in 1071
- Births in 1070

=== 1060s ===
- Births in 1069
- Births in 1068
- Births in 1067
- Births in 1066
- Births in 1065
- Births in 1064
- Births in 1063
- Births in 1062
- Births in 1061
- Births in 1060

=== 1050s ===
- Births in 1059
- Births in 1058
- Births in 1057
- Births in 1056
- Births in 1055
- Births in 1054
- Births in 1053
- Births in 1052
- Births in 1051
- Births in 1050

=== 1040s ===
- Births in 1049
- Births in 1048
- Births in 1047
- Births in 1046
- Births in 1045
- Births in 1044
- Births in 1043
- Births in 1042
- Births in 1041
- Births in 1040

=== 1030s ===
- Births in 1039
- Births in 1038
- Births in 1037
- Births in 1036
- Births in 1035
- Births in 1034
- Births in 1033
- Births in 1032
- Births in 1031
- Births in 1030

=== 1020s ===
- Births in 1029
- Births in 1028
- Births in 1027
- Births in 1026
- Births in 1025
- Births in 1024
- Births in 1023
- Births in 1022
- Births in 1021
- Births in 1020

=== 1010s ===
- Births in 1019
- Births in 1018
- Births in 1017
- Births in 1016
- Births in 1015
- Births in 1014
- Births in 1013
- Births in 1012
- Births in 1011
- Births in 1010

=== 1000s ===
- Births in 1009
- Births in 1008
- Births in 1007
- Births in 1006
- Births in 1005
- Births in 1004
- Births in 1003
- Births in 1002
- Births in 1001
- Births in 1000

== 10th century ==
=== 990s ===
- Births in 999
- Births in 998
- Births in 997
- Births in 996
- Births in 995
- Births in 994
- Births in 993
- Births in 992
- Births in 991
- Births in 990

=== 980s ===
- Births in 989
- Births in 988
- Births in 987
- Births in 986
- Births in 985
- Births in 984
- Births in 983
- Births in 982
- Births in 981
- Births in 980

=== 970s ===
- Births in 979
- Births in 978
- Births in 977
- Births in 976
- Births in 975
- Births in 974
- Births in 973
- Births in 972
- Births in 971
- Births in 970

=== 960s ===
- Births in 969
- Births in 968
- Births in 967
- Births in 966
- Births in 965
- Births in 964
- Births in 963
- Births in 962
- Births in 961
- Births in 960

=== 950s ===
- Births in 959
- Births in 958
- Births in 957
- Births in 956
- Births in 955
- Births in 954
- Births in 953
- Births in 952
- Births in 951
- Births in 950

=== 940s ===
- Births in 949
- Births in 948
- Births in 947
- Births in 946
- Births in 945
- Births in 944
- Births in 943
- Births in 942
- Births in 941
- Births in 940

=== 930s ===
- Births in 939
- Births in 938
- Births in 937
- Births in 936
- Births in 935
- Births in 934
- Births in 933
- Births in 932
- Births in 931
- Births in 930

=== 920s ===
- Births in 929
- Births in 928
- Births in 927
- Births in 926
- Births in 925
- Births in 924
- Births in 923
- Births in 922
- Births in 921
- Births in 920

=== 910s ===
- Births in 919
- Births in 918
- Births in 917
- Births in 916
- Births in 915
- Births in 914
- Births in 913
- Births in 912
- Births in 911
- Births in 910

=== 900s ===
- Births in 909
- Births in 908
- Births in 907
- Births in 906
- Births in 905
- Births in 904
- Births in 903
- Births in 902
- Births in 901
- Births in 900

== 9th century ==
=== 890s ===
- Births in 899
- Births in 898
- Births in 897
- Births in 896
- Births in 895
- Births in 894
- Births in 893
- Births in 892
- Births in 891
- Births in 890

=== 880s ===
- Births in 889
- Births in 888
- Births in 887
- Births in 886
- Births in 885
- Births in 884
- Births in 883
- Births in 882
- Births in 881
- Births in 880

=== 870s ===
- Births in 879
- Births in 878
- Births in 877
- Births in 876
- Births in 875
- Births in 874
- Births in 873
- Births in 872
- Births in 871
- Births in 870

=== 860s ===
- Births in 869
- Births in 868
- Births in 867
- Births in 866
- Births in 865
- Births in 864
- Births in 863
- Births in 862
- Births in 861
- Births in 860

=== 850s ===
- Births in 859
- Births in 858
- Births in 857
- Births in 856
- Births in 855
- Births in 854
- Births in 853
- Births in 852
- Births in 851
- Births in 850

=== 840s ===
- Births in 849
- Births in 848
- Births in 847
- Births in 846
- Births in 845
- Births in 844
- Births in 843
- Births in 842
- Births in 841
- Births in 840

=== 830s ===
- Births in 839
- Births in 838
- Births in 837
- Births in 836
- Births in 835
- Births in 834
- Births in 833
- Births in 832
- Births in 831
- Births in 830

=== 820s ===
- Births in 829
- Births in 828
- Births in 827
- Births in 826
- Births in 825
- Births in 824
- Births in 823
- Births in 822
- Births in 821
- Births in 820

=== 810s ===
- Births in 819
- Births in 818
- Births in 817
- Births in 816
- Births in 815
- Births in 814
- Births in 813
- Births in 812
- Births in 811
- Births in 810

=== 800s ===
- Births in 809
- Births in 808
- Births in 807
- Births in 806
- Births in 805
- Births in 804
- Births in 803
- Births in 802
- Births in 801
- Births in 800

== 8th century ==
=== 790s ===
- Births in 799
- Births in 798
- Births in 797
- Births in 796
- Births in 795
- Births in 794
- Births in 793
- Births in 792
- Births in 791
- Births in 790

=== 780s ===
- Births in 789
- Births in 788
- Births in 787
- Births in 786
- Births in 785
- Births in 784
- Births in 783
- Births in 782
- Births in 781
- Births in 780

=== 770s ===
- Births in 779
- Births in 778
- Births in 777
- Births in 776
- Births in 775
- Births in 774
- Births in 773
- Births in 772
- Births in 771
- Births in 770

=== 760s ===
- Births in 769
- Births in 768
- Births in 767
- Births in 766
- Births in 765
- Births in 764
- Births in 763
- Births in 762
- Births in 761
- Births in 760

=== 750s ===
- Births in 759
- Births in 758
- Births in 757
- Births in 756
- Births in 755
- Births in 754
- Births in 753
- Births in 752
- Births in 751
- Births in 750

=== 740s ===
- Births in 749
- Births in 748
- Births in 747
- Births in 746
- Births in 745
- Births in 744
- Births in 743
- Births in 742
- Births in 741
- Births in 740

=== 730s ===
- Births in 739
- Births in 738
- Births in 737
- Births in 736
- Births in 735
- Births in 734
- Births in 733
- Births in 732
- Births in 731
- Births in 730

=== 720s ===
- Births in 729
- Births in 728
- Births in 727
- Births in 726
- Births in 725
- Births in 724
- Births in 723
- Births in 722
- Births in 721
- Births in 720

=== 710s ===
- Births in 719
- Births in 718
- Births in 717
- Births in 716
- Births in 715
- Births in 714
- Births in 713
- Births in 712
- Births in 711
- Births in 710

=== 700s ===
- Births in 709
- Births in 708
- Births in 707
- Births in 706
- Births in 705
- Births in 704
- Births in 703
- Births in 702
- Births in 701
- Births in 700

== 7th century ==
=== 690s ===
- Births in 699
- Births in 698
- Births in 697
- Births in 696
- Births in 695
- Births in 694
- Births in 693
- Births in 692
- Births in 691
- Births in 690

=== 680s ===
- Births in 689
- Births in 688
- Births in 687
- Births in 686
- Births in 685
- Births in 684
- Births in 683
- Births in 682
- Births in 681
- Births in 680

=== 670s ===
- Births in 679
- Births in 678
- Births in 677
- Births in 676
- Births in 675
- Births in 674
- Births in 673
- Births in 672
- Births in 671
- Births in 670

=== 660s ===
- Births in 669
- Births in 668
- Births in 667
- Births in 666
- Births in 665
- Births in 664
- Births in 663
- Births in 662
- Births in 661
- Births in 660

=== 650s ===
- Births in 659
- Births in 658
- Births in 657
- Births in 656
- Births in 655
- Births in 654
- Births in 653
- Births in 652
- Births in 651
- Births in 650

=== 640s ===
- Births in 649
- Births in 648
- Births in 647
- Births in 646
- Births in 645
- Births in 644
- Births in 643
- Births in 642
- Births in 641
- Births in 640

=== 630s ===
- Births in 639
- Births in 638
- Births in 637
- Births in 636
- Births in 635
- Births in 634
- Births in 633
- Births in 632
- Births in 631
- Births in 630

=== 620s ===
- Births in 629
- Births in 628
- Births in 627
- Births in 626
- Births in 625
- Births in 624
- Births in 623
- Births in 622
- Births in 621
- Births in 620

=== 610s ===
- Births in 619
- Births in 618
- Births in 617
- Births in 616
- Births in 615
- Births in 614
- Births in 613
- Births in 612
- Births in 611
- Births in 610

=== 600s ===
- Births in 609
- Births in 608
- Births in 607
- Births in 606
- Births in 605
- Births in 604
- Births in 603
- Births in 602
- Births in 601
- Births in 600

== 6th century ==
=== 590s ===
- Births in 599
- Births in 598
- Births in 597
- Births in 596
- Births in 595
- Births in 594
- Births in 593
- Births in 592
- Births in 591
- Births in 590

=== 580s ===
- Births in 589
- Births in 588
- Births in 587
- Births in 586
- Births in 585
- Births in 584
- Births in 583
- Births in 582
- Births in 581
- Births in 580

=== 570s ===
- Births in 579
- Births in 578
- Births in 577
- Births in 576
- Births in 575
- Births in 574
- Births in 573
- Births in 572
- Births in 571
- Births in 570

=== 560s ===
- Births in 569
- Births in 568
- Births in 567
- Births in 566
- Births in 565
- Births in 564
- Births in 563
- Births in 562
- Births in 561
- Births in 560

=== 550s ===
- Births in 559
- Births in 558
- Births in 557
- Births in 556
- Births in 555
- Births in 554
- Births in 553
- Births in 552
- Births in 551
- Births in 550

=== 540s ===
- Births in 549
- Births in 548
- Births in 547
- Births in 546
- Births in 545
- Births in 544
- Births in 543
- Births in 542
- Births in 541
- Births in 540

=== 530s ===
- Births in 539
- Births in 538
- Births in 537
- Births in 536
- Births in 535
- Births in 534
- Births in 533
- Births in 532
- Births in 531
- Births in 530

=== 520s ===
- Births in 529
- Births in 528
- Births in 527
- Births in 526
- Births in 525
- Births in 524
- Births in 523
- Births in 522
- Births in 521
- Births in 520

=== 510s ===
- Births in 519
- Births in 518
- Births in 517
- Births in 516
- Births in 515
- Births in 514
- Births in 513
- Births in 512
- Births in 511
- Births in 510

=== 500s ===
- Births in 509
- Births in 508
- Births in 507
- Births in 506
- Births in 505
- Births in 504
- Births in 503
- Births in 502
- Births in 501
- Births in 500

== 5th century ==
=== 490s ===
- Births in 499
- Births in 498
- Births in 497
- Births in 496
- Births in 495
- Births in 494
- Births in 493
- Births in 492
- Births in 491
- Births in 490

=== 480s ===
- Births in 489
- Births in 488
- Births in 487
- Births in 486
- Births in 485
- Births in 484
- Births in 483
- Births in 482
- Births in 481
- Births in 480

=== 470s ===
- Births in 479
- Births in 478
- Births in 477
- Births in 476
- Births in 475
- Births in 474
- Births in 473
- Births in 472
- Births in 471
- Births in 470

=== 460s ===
- Births in 469
- Births in 468
- Births in 467
- Births in 466
- Births in 465
- Births in 464
- Births in 463
- Births in 462
- Births in 461
- Births in 460

=== 450s ===
- Births in 459
- Births in 458
- Births in 457
- Births in 456
- Births in 455
- Births in 454
- Births in 453
- Births in 452
- Births in 451
- Births in 450

=== 440s ===
- Births in 449
- Births in 448
- Births in 447
- Births in 446
- Births in 445
- Births in 444
- Births in 443
- Births in 442
- Births in 441
- Births in 440

=== 430s ===
- Births in 439
- Births in 438
- Births in 437
- Births in 436
- Births in 435
- Births in 434
- Births in 433
- Births in 432
- Births in 431
- Births in 430

=== 420s ===
- Births in 429
- Births in 428
- Births in 427
- Births in 426
- Births in 425
- Births in 424
- Births in 423
- Births in 422
- Births in 421
- Births in 420

=== 410s ===
- Births in 419
- Births in 418
- Births in 417
- Births in 416
- Births in 415
- Births in 414
- Births in 413
- Births in 412
- Births in 411
- Births in 410

=== 400s ===
- Births in 409
- Births in 408
- Births in 407
- Births in 406
- Births in 405
- Births in 404
- Births in 403
- Births in 402
- Births in 401
- Births in 400

== 4th century ==
=== 390s ===
- Births in 399
- Births in 398
- Births in 397
- Births in 396
- Births in 395
- Births in 394
- Births in 393
- Births in 392
- Births in 391
- Births in 390

=== 380s ===
- Births in 389
- Births in 388
- Births in 387
- Births in 386
- Births in 385
- Births in 384
- Births in 383
- Births in 382
- Births in 381
- Births in 380

=== 370s ===
- Births in 379
- Births in 378
- Births in 377
- Births in 376
- Births in 375
- Births in 374
- Births in 373
- Births in 372
- Births in 371
- Births in 370

=== 360s ===
- Births in 369
- Births in 368
- Births in 367
- Births in 366
- Births in 365
- Births in 364
- Births in 363
- Births in 362
- Births in 361
- Births in 360

=== 350s ===
- Births in 359
- Births in 358
- Births in 357
- Births in 356
- Births in 355
- Births in 354
- Births in 353
- Births in 352
- Births in 351
- Births in 350

=== 340s ===
- Births in 349
- Births in 348
- Births in 347
- Births in 346
- Births in 345
- Births in 344
- Births in 343
- Births in 342
- Births in 341
- Births in 340

=== 330s ===
- Births in 339
- Births in 338
- Births in 337
- Births in 336
- Births in 335
- Births in 334
- Births in 333
- Births in 332
- Births in 331
- Births in 330

=== 320s ===
- Births in 329
- Births in 328
- Births in 327
- Births in 326
- Births in 325
- Births in 324
- Births in 323
- Births in 322
- Births in 321
- Births in 320

=== 310s ===
- Births in 319
- Births in 318
- Births in 317
- Births in 316
- Births in 315
- Births in 314
- Births in 313
- Births in 312
- Births in 311
- Births in 310

=== 300s ===
- Births in 309
- Births in 308
- Births in 307
- Births in 306
- Births in 305
- Births in 304
- Births in 303
- Births in 302
- Births in 301
- Births in 300

== 3rd century ==
=== 290s ===
- Births in 299
- Births in 298
- Births in 297
- Births in 296
- Births in 295
- Births in 294
- Births in 293
- Births in 292
- Births in 291
- Births in 290

=== 280s ===
- Births in 289
- Births in 288
- Births in 287
- Births in 286
- Births in 285
- Births in 284
- Births in 283
- Births in 282
- Births in 281
- Births in 280

=== 270s ===
- Births in 279
- Births in 278
- Births in 277
- Births in 276
- Births in 275
- Births in 274
- Births in 273
- Births in 272
- Births in 271
- Births in 270

=== 260s ===
- Births in 269
- Births in 268
- Births in 267
- Births in 266
- Births in 265
- Births in 264
- Births in 263
- Births in 262
- Births in 261
- Births in 260

=== 250s ===
- Births in 259
- Births in 258
- Births in 257
- Births in 256
- Births in 255
- Births in 254
- Births in 253
- Births in 252
- Births in 251
- Births in 250

=== 240s ===
- Births in 249
- Births in 248
- Births in 247
- Births in 246
- Births in 245
- Births in 244
- Births in 243
- Births in 242
- Births in 241
- Births in 240

=== 230s ===
- Births in 239
- Births in 238
- Births in 237
- Births in 236
- Births in 235
- Births in 234
- Births in 233
- Births in 232
- Births in 231
- Births in 230

=== 220s ===
- Births in 229
- Births in 228
- Births in 227
- Births in 226
- Births in 225
- Births in 224
- Births in 223
- Births in 222
- Births in 221
- Births in 220

=== 210s ===
- Births in 219
- Births in 218
- Births in 217
- Births in 216
- Births in 215
- Births in 214
- Births in 213
- Births in 212
- Births in 211
- Births in 210

=== 200s ===
- Births in 209
- Births in 208
- Births in 207
- Births in 206
- Births in 205
- Births in 204
- Births in 203
- Births in 202
- Births in 201
- Births in 200

== 2nd century ==
=== 190s ===
- Births in 199
- Births in 198
- Births in 197
- Births in 196
- Births in 195
- Births in 194
- Births in 193
- Births in 192
- Births in 191
- Births in 190

=== 180s ===
- Births in 189
- Births in 188
- Births in 187
- Births in 186
- Births in 185
- Births in 184
- Births in 183
- Births in 182
- Births in 181
- Births in 180

=== 170s ===
- Births in 179
- Births in 178
- Births in 177
- Births in 176
- Births in 175
- Births in 174
- Births in 173
- Births in 172
- Births in 171
- Births in 170

=== 160s ===
- Births in 169
- Births in 168
- Births in 167
- Births in 166
- Births in 165
- Births in 164
- Births in 163
- Births in 162
- Births in 161
- Births in 160

=== 150s ===
- Births in 159
- Births in 158
- Births in 157
- Births in 156
- Births in 155
- Births in 154
- Births in 153
- Births in 152
- Births in 151
- Births in 150

=== 140s ===
- Births in 149
- Births in 148
- Births in 147
- Births in 146
- Births in 145
- Births in 144
- Births in 143
- Births in 142
- Births in 141
- Births in 140

=== 130s ===
- Births in 139
- Births in 138
- Births in 137
- Births in 136
- Births in 135
- Births in 134
- Births in 133
- Births in 132
- Births in 131
- Births in 130

=== 120s ===
- Births in 129
- Births in 128
- Births in 127
- Births in 126
- Births in 125
- Births in 124
- Births in 123
- Births in 122
- Births in 121
- Births in 120

=== 110s ===
- Births in 119
- Births in 118
- Births in 117
- Births in 116
- Births in 115
- Births in 114
- Births in 113
- Births in 112
- Births in 111
- Births in 110

=== 100s ===
- Births in 109
- Births in 108
- Births in 107
- Births in 106
- Births in 105
- Births in 104
- Births in 103
- Births in 102
- Births in 101
- Births in 100

== 1st century ==
=== 90s ===
- Births in 99
- Births in 98
- Births in 97
- Births in 96
- Births in 95
- Births in 94
- Births in 93
- Births in 92
- Births in 91
- Births in 90

=== 80s ===
- Births in 89
- Births in 88
- Births in 87
- Births in 86
- Births in 85
- Births in 84
- Births in 83
- Births in 82
- Births in 81
- Births in 80

=== 70s ===
- Births in 79
- Births in 78
- Births in 77
- Births in 76
- Births in 75
- Births in 74
- Births in 73
- Births in 72
- Births in 71
- Births in 70

=== 60s ===
- Births in 69
- Births in 68
- Births in 67
- Births in 66
- Births in 65
- Births in 64
- Births in 63
- Births in 62
- Births in 61
- Births in 60

=== 50s ===
- Births in 59
- Births in 58
- Births in 57
- Births in 56
- Births in 55
- Births in 54
- Births in 53
- Births in 52
- Births in 51
- Births in 50

=== 40s ===
- Births in 49
- Births in 48
- Births in 47
- Births in 46
- Births in 45
- Births in 44
- Births in 43
- Births in 42
- Births in 41
- Births in 40

=== 30s ===
- Births in 39
- Births in 38
- Births in 37
- Births in 36
- Births in 35
- Births in 34
- Births in 33
- Births in 32
- Births in 31
- Births in 30

=== 20s ===
- Births in 29
- Births in 28
- Births in 27
- Births in 26
- Births in 25
- Births in 24
- Births in 23
- Births in 22
- Births in 21
- Births in 20

=== 10s ===
- Births in 19
- Births in 18
- Births in 17
- Births in 16
- Births in 15
- Births in 14
- Births in 13
- Births in 12
- Births in 11
- Births in 10

=== 00s ===
- Births in 9
- Births in 8
- Births in 7
- Births in 6
- Births in 5
- Births in 4
- Births in 3
- Births in 2
- Births in 1

== See also ==
- List of days of the year
- List of deaths by year
- Births by year (category)
