= 205 =

205 in various calendars
- Gregorian calendar: 205; CCV
- Ab urbe condita: 958
- Assyrian calendar: 4955
- Balinese saka calendar: 126–127
- Bengali calendar: −389 – −388
- Berber calendar: 1155
- Buddhist calendar: 749
- Burmese calendar: −433
- Byzantine calendar: 5713–5714
- Chinese calendar: 甲申年 (Wood Monkey); 2902 or 2695 — to — 乙酉年 (Wood Rooster); 2903 or 2696
- Coptic calendar: −79 – −78
- Discordian calendar: 1371
- Ethiopian calendar: 197–198
- Hebrew calendar: 3965–3966
- Hindu calendars
- Vikram Samvat: 261–262
- Shaka Samvat: 126–127
- Kali Yuga: 3305–3306
- Holocene calendar: 10205
- Iranian calendar: 417 BP – 416 BP
- Islamic calendar: 430 BH – 429 BH
- Javanese calendar: 82–83
- Julian calendar: 205; CCV
- Korean calendar: 2538
- Minguo calendar: 1707 before ROC 民前1707年
- Nanakshahi calendar: −1263
- Seleucid era: 516/517 AG
- Thai solar calendar: 747–748
- Tibetan calendar: ཤིང་ཕོ་སྤྲེ་ལོ་ (male Wood-Monkey); 331 or −50 or −822 — to — ཤིང་མོ་བྱ་ལོ་ (female Wood-Bird); 332 or −49 or −821

Year 205 (CCV) was a common year starting on Tuesday of the Julian calendar. At the time, it was known as the Year of the Consulship of Aurelius and Geta (or, less frequently, year 958 Ab urbe condita). The denomination 205 for this year has been used since the early medieval period, when the Anno Domini calendar era became the prevalent method in Europe for naming years.

== Events ==
=== By place ===
==== Roman Empire ====
- Marcus Aurelius Antoninus Augustus and his brother Publius Septimius Geta Caesar become Roman Consuls.
- Hadrian's Wall is restored, after heavy raids by Caledonian tribes had overrun much of northern Britain.
- January 22 – Gaius Fulvius Plautianus, a praetorian prefect and father-in-law of Caracalla, is assassinated.
- Aemilius Papinianus becomes praetorian prefect, after the death of Gaius Fulvius Plautianus.

==== China ====
- Battle of Nanpi: Warlord Cao Cao defeats and kills Yuan Tan, the eldest son of his rival Yuan Shao.
- End of the Yellow Turban Rebellion

== Births ==
- Cao Rui, Chinese emperor of Cao Wei (d. 239)
- Gu Tan, Chinese official and politician (d. 246)
- Plotinus, Greek philosopher and writer (d. 270)
- Shan Tao, Chinese Taoist scholar and official (d. 283)
- Sima Wang, Chinese prince and general (d. 271)
- Zhang Xiu (or Shusi), Chinese general (d. 245)

== Deaths ==
- January 22 – Gaius Fulvius Plautianus, Roman consul
- Guo Tu (or Gongze), Chinese official and politician
- Marcus Peducaeus Plautius Quintillus, Roman consul
- Popilius Pedo Apronianus, Roman politician
- Yuan Tan, Chinese general and warlord
- Basilides and Potamiana
