= 204 =

204 in various calendars
Gregorian calendar	204; CCIV
Ab urbe condita	957
Assyrian calendar	4954
Balinese saka calendar	125–126
Bengali calendar	−390 – −389
Berber calendar	1154
Buddhist calendar	748
Burmese calendar	−434
Byzantine calendar	5712–5713
Chinese calendar	癸未年 (Water Goat); 2901 or 2694 — to — 甲申年 (Wood Monkey); 2902 or 2695
Coptic calendar	−80 – −79
Discordian calendar	1370
Ethiopian calendar	196–197
Hebrew calendar	3964–3965
- Hindu calendars
Vikram Samvat	260–261
Shaka Samvat	125–126
Kali Yuga	3304–3305
Holocene calendar	10204
Iranian calendar	418 BP – 417 BP
Islamic calendar	431 BH – 430 BH
Javanese calendar	81–82
Julian calendar	204; CCIV
Korean calendar	2537
Minguo calendar	1708 before ROC 民前1708年
Nanakshahi calendar	−1264
Seleucid era	515/516 AG
Thai solar calendar	746–747
Tibetan calendar	阴水羊年 (female Water-Goat); 330 or −51 or −823 — to — 阳木猴年 (male Wood-Monkey); 331 or −50 or −822

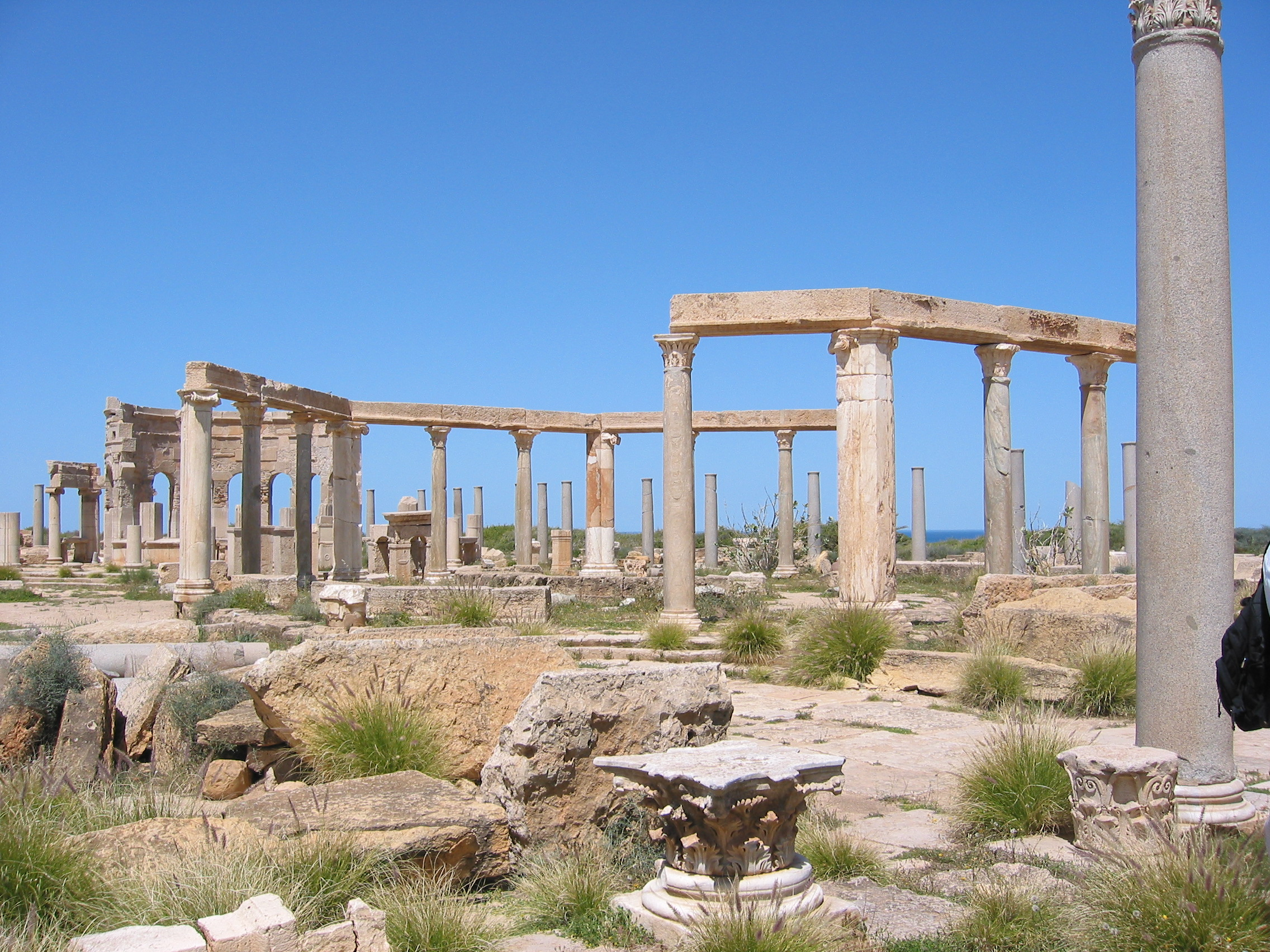
Leptis Magna (market place)

Year 204 (CCIV) was a leap year starting on Sunday of the Julian calendar. At the time, it was known as the Year of the Consulship of Cilo and Flavius (or, less frequently, year 957 Ab urbe condita). The denomination 204 for this year has been used since the early medieval period, when the Anno Domini calendar era became the prevalent method in Europe for naming years.

== Events ==
=== By place ===
==== Roman Empire ====
- Lucius Fabius Cilo and Marcus Annius Flavius Libo become Roman Consuls.
- The Daysan River floods Edessa.

==== China ====
- Gongsun Kang, Chinese warlord of Liaodong, establishes the Daifang Commandery in northern Korea.
- Battle of Ye: Warlord Cao Cao lays siege to and captures the military headquarter of Yuan Shao in Ye.

=== By topic ===
==== Commerce ====
- A trade recession in the Leptis Magna region (Africa) is alleviated by Emperor Septimius Severus, who buys up the country's olive oil for free distribution in Rome.

== Births ==
- Cao Rui, Chinese emperor of Cao Wei (d. 239)
- Dong Jue, Chinese official and general
- Elagabalus, Roman emperor (d. 222)
- Philip the Arab, Roman emperor (d. 249)
- Wei Zhao, Chinese historian (d. 273)
- Zhuge Qiao, Chinese official and general (d. 228)

== Deaths ==
- Gongsun Du, Chinese general and warlord (b. 150)
- Ren Jun, Chinese general under Cao Cao
- Shen Pei, Chinese official and minister
- Xin Ping, Chinese official and minister
- Xu You, Chinese adviser and strategist
