= 324 =

324 in various calendars
- Gregorian calendar: 324; CCCXXIV
- Ab urbe condita: 1077
- Assyrian calendar: 5074
- Balinese saka calendar: 245–246
- Bengali calendar: −270 – −269
- Berber calendar: 1274
- Buddhist calendar: 868
- Burmese calendar: −314
- Byzantine calendar: 5832–5833
- Chinese calendar: 癸未年 (Water Goat); 3021 or 2814 — to — 甲申年 (Wood Monkey); 3022 or 2815
- Coptic calendar: 40–41
- Discordian calendar: 1490
- Ethiopian calendar: 316–317
- Hebrew calendar: 4084–4085
- Hindu calendars
- Vikram Samvat: 380–381
- Shaka Samvat: 245–246
- Kali Yuga: 3424–3425
- Holocene calendar: 10324
- Iranian calendar: 298 BP – 297 BP
- Islamic calendar: 307 BH – 306 BH
- Javanese calendar: 205–206
- Julian calendar: 324; CCCXXIV
- Korean calendar: 2657
- Minguo calendar: 1588 before ROC 民前1588年
- Nanakshahi calendar: −1144
- Seleucid era: 635/636 AG
- Thai solar calendar: 866–867
- Tibetan calendar: ཆུ་མོ་ལུག་ལོ་ (female Water-Sheep); 450 or 69 or −703 — to — ཤིང་ཕོ་སྤྲེ་ལོ་ (male Wood-Monkey); 451 or 70 or −702

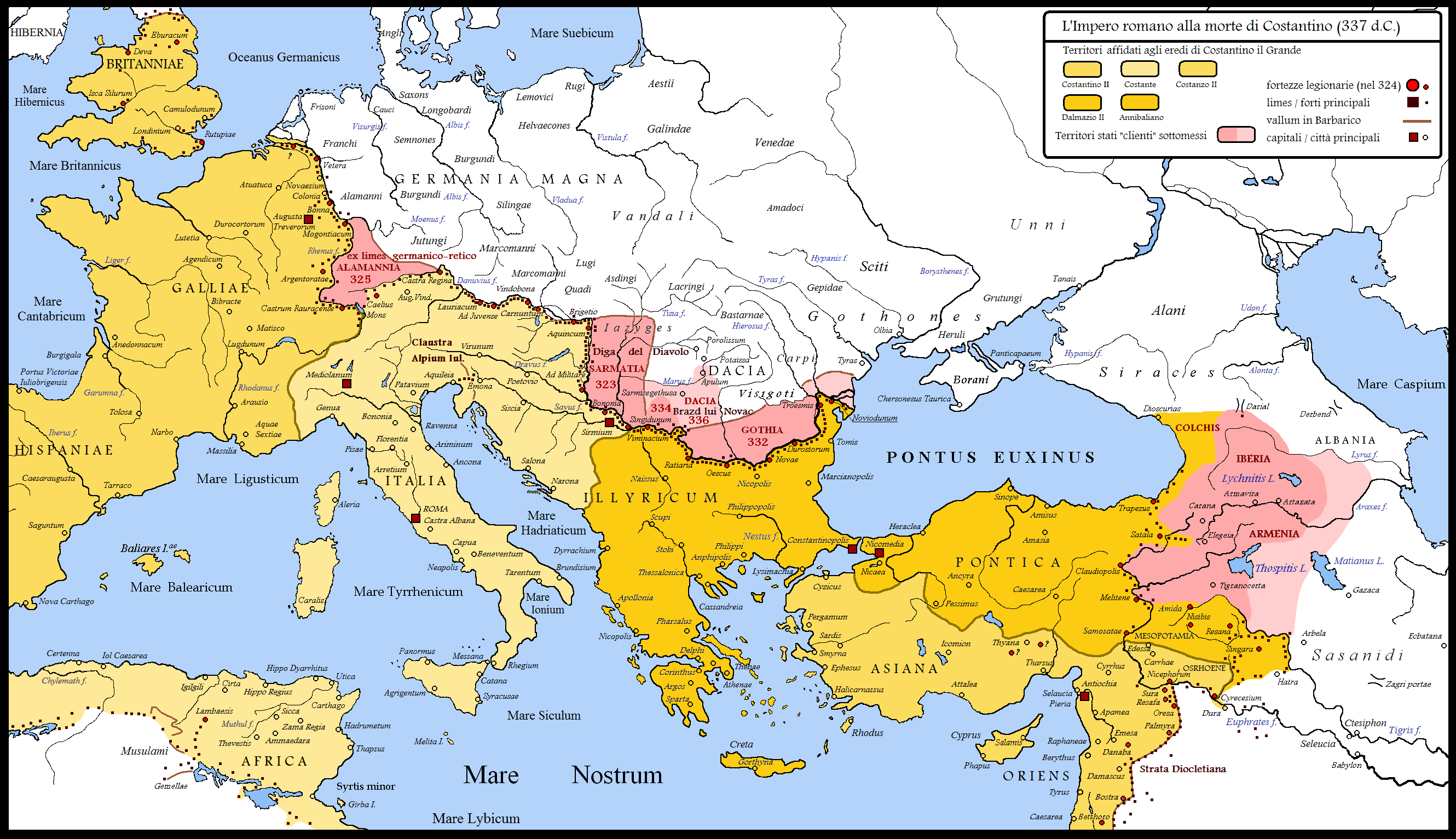
The northern and eastern frontiers of the Roman Empire in the time of Constantine, with the territories acquired in the course of the thirty years of military campaigns between 306 and 337.

Year 324 (CCCXXIV) was a leap year starting on Wednesday in the Julian calendar. At the time, it was known as the Year of the Consulship of Crispus and Constantinus (or, less frequently, year 1077 Ab urbe condita). The denomination 324 for this year has been used since the early medieval period, when the Anno Domini calendar era became the prevalent method in Europe for naming years.

== Events ==
=== Roman Empire ===
- January 1 – Flavius Julius Crispus Caesar, the sons of the Emperor Constantine and his expected heir, and Flavius Claudius Constantinus begin their one year terms as the new Roman consuls.
- June – The earliest known use of the Greek word monachós to refer to a monk is made in a petition filed in Egypt by a man named Aurelius Isidorus, a man from the town of Karanis in Egypt.
- July 3 – Battle of Adrianople: Emperor Constantine the Great defeats his rival Licinius near Adrianople, forcing him to retreat to Byzantium. Constantine then invades Thrace with a Visigothic force and raids the countryside.
- July – Battle of the Hellespont: Flavius Julius Crispus, the designated heir of his father Constantine, destroys the naval fleet of Licinius in the Dardanelles, allowing Constantine to cross over the Bosphorus into Asian provinces. Byzantium is besieged and Licinius assembles a second military force, under his newly elevated co-emperor Martinian at Lampsacus (modern-day Lapseki).
- September 18 – Battle of Chrysopolis: Constantine I definitively defeats Licinius at Chrysopolis, and becomes sole Emperor, thus ending the period of the Tetrarchy. Licinius escapes and gathers around 30,000 of his surviving troops at Nicomedia. Thus, the Civil wars of the Tetrarchy, which began in 306, end with Constantine ruling as sole Emperor.
- November 8 – Emperor Constantine declares his son, Flavius Julius Constantius, to the rank of caesar.
- November 9 – Dedication of the Lateran Basilica in Rome.
- December 19 – Licinius abdicates his position as Emperor. He is pardoned by Constantine I as a result of the supplication of his wife Constantia (who is Constantine's halfsister), and banished to Thessalonica as a private citizen.
- (Date unknown) The Roman Emperor Constantine I seizes the Byzantine Empire's capital, Byzantium, and commences work on rebuilding the city as the Eastern Empire's capital, which he will inaugurate as Constantinople in 330.
- Constantine reorganises the Roman army in smaller units classified into three grades: palatini, (imperial escort armies); comitatenses, (forces based in frontier provinces) and limitanei (auxilia border troops).

=== China ===
- August 9 – (guiyou day of the 7th month of the 2nd year of the Tai'ning era) In Jin dynasty China, the rebel warlord Wang Dun succumbs to illness as the armies of the Emperor Ming of Jin are approaching his camp.

== Births ==
- Chu Suanzi, Chinese empress of the Jin dynasty (d. 384)

== Deaths ==
- Guo Pu, Chinese historian, poet and writer (b. 276)
- Wang Dun (or Chuzhong), Chinese warlord (b. 266)
- Zhang Mao, Chinese ruler of Former Liang (b. 277)
