= AD 188 =

188 in various calendars
- Gregorian calendar: 188; CLXXXVIII
- Ab urbe condita: 941
- Assyrian calendar: 4938
- Balinese saka calendar: 109–110
- Bengali calendar: −406 – −405
- Berber calendar: 1138
- Buddhist calendar: 732
- Burmese calendar: −450
- Byzantine calendar: 5696–5697
- Chinese calendar: 丁卯年 (Fire Rabbit); 2885 or 2678 — to — 戊辰年 (Earth Dragon); 2886 or 2679
- Coptic calendar: −96 – −95
- Discordian calendar: 1354
- Ethiopian calendar: 180–181
- Hebrew calendar: 3948–3949
- Hindu calendars
- Vikram Samvat: 244–245
- Shaka Samvat: 109–110
- Kali Yuga: 3288–3289
- Holocene calendar: 10188
- Iranian calendar: 434 BP – 433 BP
- Islamic calendar: 447 BH – 446 BH
- Javanese calendar: 65–66
- Julian calendar: 188; CLXXXVIII
- Korean calendar: 2521
- Minguo calendar: 1724 before ROC 民前1724年
- Nanakshahi calendar: −1280
- Seleucid era: 499/500 AG
- Thai solar calendar: 730–731
- Tibetan calendar: མེ་མོ་ཡོས་ལོ་ (female Fire-Hare); 314 or −67 or −839 — to — ས་ཕོ་འབྲུག་ལོ་ (male Earth-Dragon); 315 or −66 or −838

Year 188 (CLXXXVIII) was a leap year starting on Monday of the Julian calendar. At the time, it was known in the Roman Empire as the Year of the Consulship of Fuscianus and Silanus (or, less frequently, year 941 Ab urbe condita). The denomination 188 for this year has been used since the early medieval period, when the Anno Domini calendar era became the prevalent method in Europe for naming years.

== Events ==
=== By place ===
==== Roman Empire ====
- Publius Helvius Pertinax becomes pro-consul of Africa from 188 to 189.

==== Japan ====
- Queen Himiko (or Shingi Waō) begins her reign in Japan (until 248).

== Births ==
- April 4 – Caracalla (or Antoninus), Roman emperor (d. 217)
- Lu Ji (or Gongji), Chinese official and politician (d. 219)
- Sun Shao, Chinese general of the Eastern Wu state (d. 241)

== Deaths ==
- March 17 – Julian, pope and patriarch of Alexandria
- Fa Zhen (or Gaoqing), Chinese scholar (b. AD 100)
- Lucius Antistius Burrus, Roman politician (executed)
- Ma Xiang, Chinese rebel leader (approximate date)
- Publius Atilius Aebutianus, Roman prefect (executed)
- Shusun Tong, Chinese official and ritual specialist
- Qiangqui, Chinese ruler of the southern Xiongnu

== See also ==
- Ab urbe condita
- Roman numerals
