= 224 =

224 in various calendars
- Gregorian calendar: 224; CCXXIV
- Ab urbe condita: 977
- Assyrian calendar: 4974
- Balinese saka calendar: 145–146
- Bengali calendar: −370 – −369
- Berber calendar: 1174
- Buddhist calendar: 768
- Burmese calendar: −414
- Byzantine calendar: 5732–5733
- Chinese calendar: 癸卯年 (Water Rabbit); 2921 or 2714 — to — 甲辰年 (Wood Dragon); 2922 or 2715
- Coptic calendar: −60 – −59
- Discordian calendar: 1390
- Ethiopian calendar: 216–217
- Hebrew calendar: 3984–3985
- Hindu calendars
- Vikram Samvat: 280–281
- Shaka Samvat: 145–146
- Kali Yuga: 3324–3325
- Holocene calendar: 10224
- Iranian calendar: 398 BP – 397 BP
- Islamic calendar: 410 BH – 409 BH
- Javanese calendar: 102–103
- Julian calendar: 224; CCXXIV
- Korean calendar: 2557
- Minguo calendar: 1688 before ROC 民前1688年
- Nanakshahi calendar: −1244
- Seleucid era: 535/536 AG
- Thai solar calendar: 766–767
- Tibetan calendar: ཆུ་མོ་ཡོས་ལོ་ (female Water-Hare); 350 or −31 or −803 — to — ཤིང་ཕོ་འབྲུག་ལོ་ (male Wood-Dragon); 351 or −30 or −802

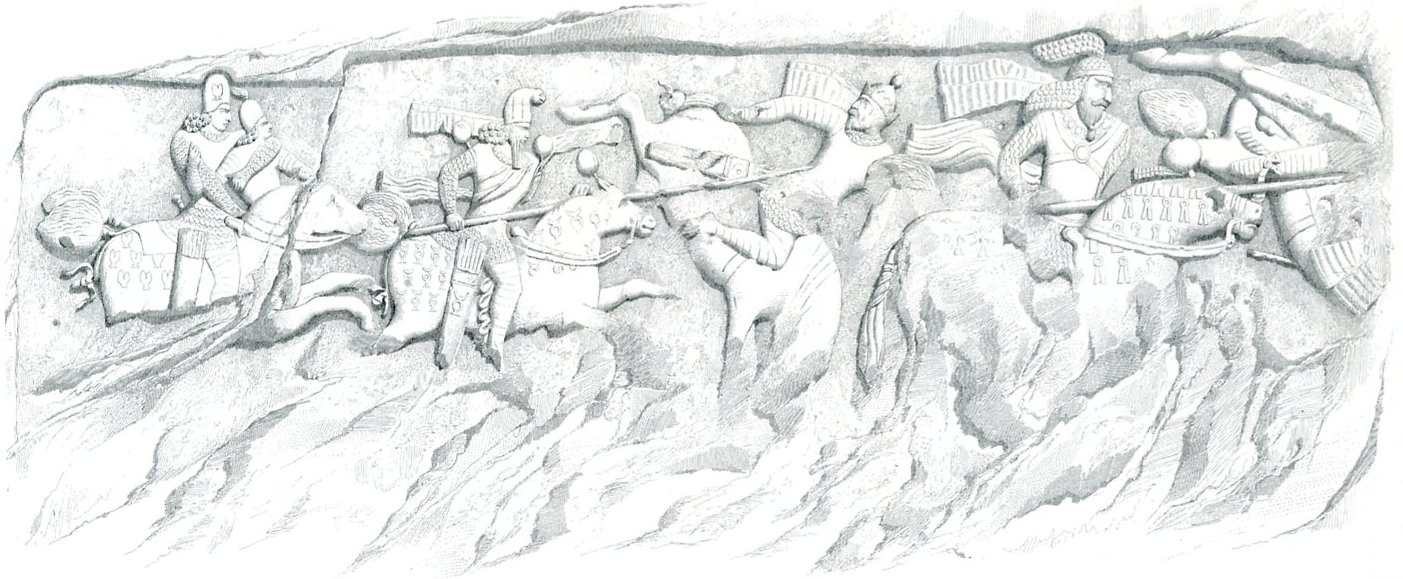
The Ardashir relief at Firuzabad (1840)

Year 224 (CCXXIV) was a leap year starting on Thursday of the Julian calendar. At the time, it was known as the Year of the Consulship of Iulianus and Crispinus (or, less frequently, year 977 Ab urbe condita). The denomination 224 for this year has been used since the early medieval period, when the Anno Domini calendar era became the prevalent method in Europe for naming years.

== Events ==
=== Roman Empire ===
- January 1 – Gaius Bellicius Torquatus and Appius Claudius Julianus II begin their one year terms as the new Roman consuls.

==== Parthia ====
- April 28 – Battle of Hormozdgan: King Ardashir I defeats Artabanus V, destroying the Parthian Empire, and establishing the Sassanid Dynasty. Artabanus V's brother Vologases VI will continue to rule, with Armenian and Kushan support, over outlying parts of Parthia.

=== China ===
- January 20 – (Huang'chu era, 4th year, 12th month and the bing'yin day) At the Cao Weis kingdom's capital at Xuchang, in what is now the Henan province of China, the Emperor Cao Pi issues a decree demoting the former Emperor Xian of Han to "Duke of Shanyang" and gives Xian's late daughter, Liu Man the posthumous title of "Princess of Changle"
- September – In the Eastern Wu Kingdom, the Emperor Sun Quan orders the demotion of General Zhang Wen and his removal from command, commenting in the decree, "Oh, Zhang Wen, you are so fortunate to be spared from death." Two other officers, General Ji Yan and General Xu Biao are arrested and permitted to commit suicide rather than to be executed.

== Births ==
- Jungcheon of Goguryeo, Korean ruler (d. 270)
- Liu Xuan (or Wenheng), Chinese prince (d. 264)
- Marcus Aurelius Carus, Roman emperor (d. 283)
- Mercurius, Christian saint and martyr (d. 250)
- Pei Xiu, Chinese official and politician (d. 271)
- Sun He (courtesy name Zixiao), Chinese prince (d. 253)

== Deaths ==
- April 28 – Artabanus IV, king of Parthia
- Du Ji, Chinese official and politician
- Ji Yan, Chinese official and politician
- Zhu Zhi, Chinese general and politician (b. 156)
