= 248 =

248 in various calendars
- Gregorian calendar: 248; CCXLVIII
- Ab urbe condita: 1001
- Assyrian calendar: 4998
- Balinese saka calendar: 169–170
- Bengali calendar: −346 – −345
- Berber calendar: 1198
- Buddhist calendar: 792
- Burmese calendar: −390
- Byzantine calendar: 5756–5757
- Chinese calendar: 丁卯年 (Fire Rabbit); 2945 or 2738 — to — 戊辰年 (Earth Dragon); 2946 or 2739
- Coptic calendar: −36 – −35
- Discordian calendar: 1414
- Ethiopian calendar: 240–241
- Hebrew calendar: 4008–4009
- Hindu calendars
- Vikram Samvat: 304–305
- Shaka Samvat: 169–170
- Kali Yuga: 3348–3349
- Holocene calendar: 10248
- Iranian calendar: 374 BP – 373 BP
- Islamic calendar: 386 BH – 384 BH
- Javanese calendar: 126–127
- Julian calendar: 248; CCXLVIII
- Korean calendar: 2581
- Minguo calendar: 1664 before ROC 民前1664年
- Nanakshahi calendar: −1220
- Seleucid era: 559/560 AG
- Thai solar calendar: 790–791
- Tibetan calendar: མེ་མོ་ཡོས་ལོ་ (female Fire-Hare); 374 or −7 or −779 — to — ས་ཕོ་འབྲུག་ལོ་ (male Earth-Dragon); 375 or −6 or −778

Year 248 (CCXLVIII) was a leap year starting on Saturday of the Julian calendar. At the time, it was known as the Year of the Consulship of Philippus and Severus (or, less frequently, year 1001 Ab urbe condita). The denomination 248 for this year has been used since the early medieval period, when the Anno Domini calendar era became the prevalent method in Europe for naming years.

== Events ==
=== By place ===
==== Roman Empire ====
- The revolts of Pacatianus in Moesia and Iotapianus in Syria are put down by Senator Trajan Decius, by order of Emperor Philip the Arab.
- The Roman Empire continues the celebration of the 1,000th anniversary of Rome, with the ludi saeculares, organized by Philip the Arab.

==== Asia ====
- Jungcheon becomes ruler of the Korean kingdom of Goguryeo (until 270).

=== By topic ===
==== Religion ====
- Origen writes an eight-volume work, criticizing the pagan writer Celsus.

== Births ==
- Flavia Iulia Helena, Greco-Roman Augusta (empress), mother of Constantine I (approximate date) (d. 330)
- Li Liu (Cheng Han or Xuantong), Chinese Grand general (d. 303)
- Sima You (or Dayou), Chinese prince and politician (d. 283)

== Deaths ==
- Dongcheon, Korean ruler of Goguryeo (b. 209)
- Himiko (or Shingi Waō), Japanese queen regnant (b. 170)
- Lady Triệu (Triệu Ẩu or Triệu Thị Trinh), Vietnamese female warrior (b. 226)
- Wang Ping, Chinese general and politician
