= 303 =

303 in various calendars
Gregorian calendar	303; CCCIII
Ab urbe condita	1056
Assyrian calendar	5053
Balinese saka calendar	224–225
Bengali calendar	−291 – −290
Berber calendar	1253
Buddhist calendar	847
Burmese calendar	−335
Byzantine calendar	5811–5812
Chinese calendar	壬戌年 (Water Dog); 3000 or 2793 — to — 癸亥年 (Water Pig); 3001 or 2794
Coptic calendar	19–20
Discordian calendar	1469
Ethiopian calendar	295–296
Hebrew calendar	4063–4064
- Hindu calendars
Vikram Samvat	359–360
Shaka Samvat	224–225
Kali Yuga	3403–3404
Holocene calendar	10303
Iranian calendar	319 BP – 318 BP
Islamic calendar	329 BH – 328 BH
Javanese calendar	183–184
Julian calendar	303; CCCIII
Korean calendar	2636
Minguo calendar	1609 before ROC 民前1609年
Nanakshahi calendar	−1165
Seleucid era	614/615 AG
Thai solar calendar	845–846
Tibetan calendar	ཆུ་ཕོ་ཁྱི་ལོ་ (male Water-Dog); 429 or 48 or −724 — to — ཆུ་མོ་ཕག་ལོ་ (female Water-Boar); 430 or 49 or −723

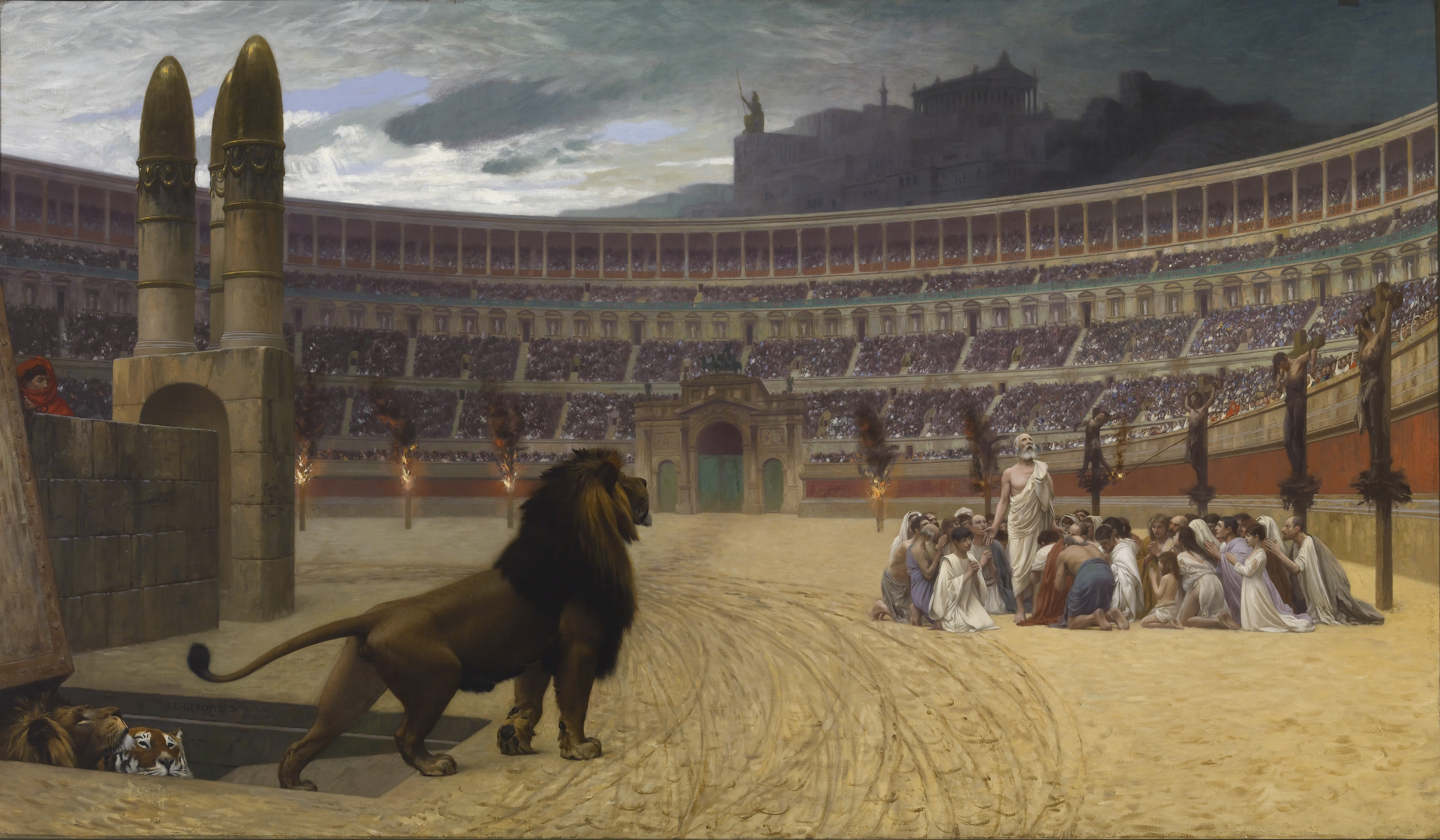
The Christian Martyrs' Last Prayer, by Jean-Léon Gérôme (1883)

Year 303 (CCCIII) was a common year starting on Friday of the Julian calendar. It was known in the Roman Empire as the Year of the Consulship of Diocletian and Maximian (or, less frequently, year 1056 Ab urbe condita). The denomination 303 for this year has been used since the early medieval period, when the Anno Domini calendar era became the prevalent method in Europe for naming years.

== Events ==
=== By place ===
==== Roman Empire ====
- Great Persecution: Emperor Diocletian launches the last and largest major persecution of Christians in the Empire. Caesar Galerius and Hierocles are said to have been the instigators. In a series of four edicts published from February 23, 303, to 304, the Christians are forbidden to worship in groups, are made to perform sacrifices, and must surrender sacred texts. Churches are destroyed, and the clergy are arrested en masse. The persecution lasts in some parts of the empire until 313, and thousands of Christians are killed. Those put to death include Agnes of Rome, a 12-year-old Christian girl who has refused marriage and consecrated her virginity to God. Hailed as a martyr, she will be honored as the patron saint of chastity, gardeners, rape victims and virgins.
- September 25 – On a voyage preaching the gospel, Saint Fermin of Pamplona is beheaded in Amiens (Modern day France).
- November 20 – The Augusti Diocletian and Maximian reunite in Rome to celebrate the 20th anniversary of Diocletian's accession, which is now treated as a joint anniversary for both emperors. A series of columns in the Roman Forum and a triumphal arch are dedicated to the emperors. The two emperors also agree on a plan of abdication.
- Galerius wins his third victory over the Carpi and is perhaps joined on campaign by Diocletian. The Arch of Galerius is dedicated in Thessaloniki.
- Caesar Constantius I wins a victory over Germanic invaders in the battle of Vindonissa.

==== Armenia ====
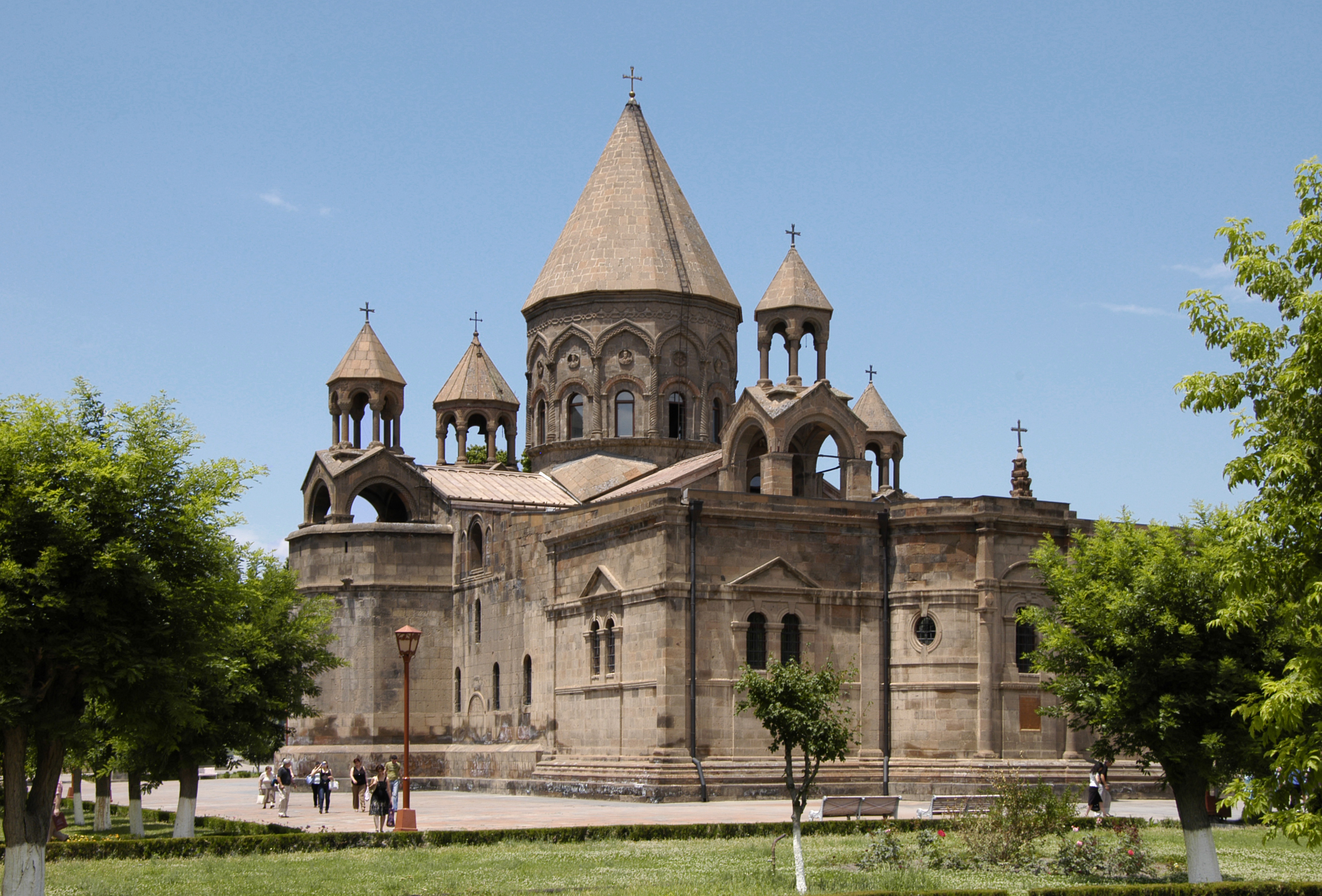
Etchmiadzin cathedral

- Etchmiadzin Cathedral is completed by Gregory the Illuminator and Tiridates III, king of Armenia.
- January 6 – Baptism of Tiridates III of Armenia.

==== America ====
- In Mexico, the civilization of Teotihuacan flourishes.

=== By topic ===
==== Religion ====
- March 4 – Adrian and Natalia of Nicomedia are martyred.

== Births ==
- Magnentius, Roman usurper (d. 353)
- Wang Xizhi, Chinese calligrapher (d. 361)
- Xun Guan, Chinese warrior and general

== Deaths ==
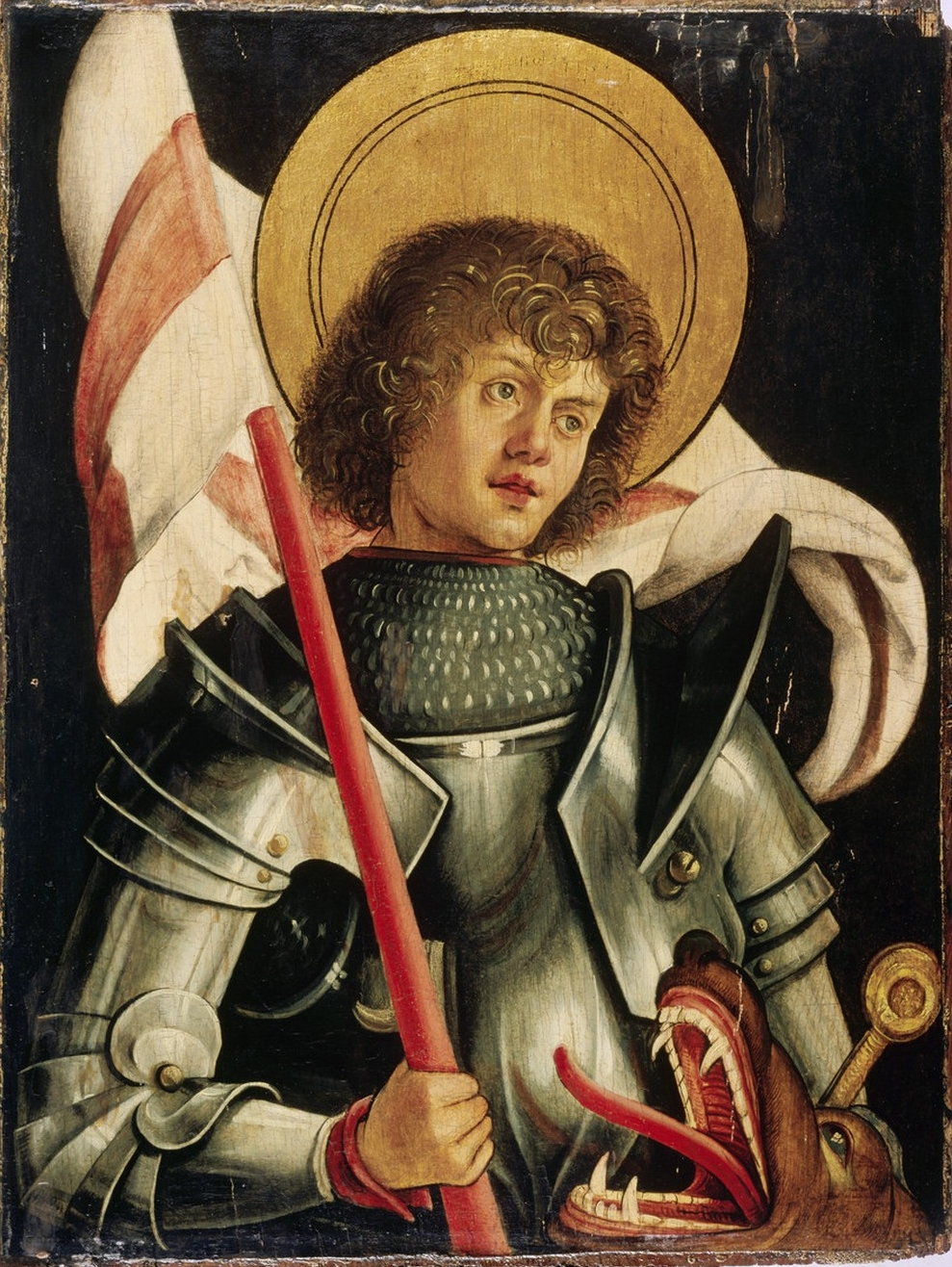
Saint George of Lydda

- April 23 – George of Lydda, Roman soldier and martyr
- Acacius of Byzantium, Roman centurion and martyr
- Anthimus of Rome, Christian priest and martyr
- Cao Huan, Chinese emperor of Cao Wei (b. 246)
- Cessianus, Christian child martyr
- Crescentinus, Roman soldier and martyr
- Cyriacus, Roman nobleman and martyr
- Devota, Corsican woman and martyr
- Erasmus of Formiae, Christian martyr
- Expeditus, Roman centurion and martyr
- Felix and Adauctus, Christian martyrs
- Fermin, Christian bishop and martyr
- Lu Ji, Chinese general and writer (b. 261)
- Li Liu, Chinese spiritual leader (b. 248)
- Li Te (or Xuanxiu), Chinese general
- Pantaleon, Christian wonderworker and martyr
- Romanus of Caesarea, Christian martyr
- Victor Maurus ("the Moor"), Christian martyr
- Vitus (or Guido), Christian martyr
