= 283 =

283 in various calendars
Gregorian calendar	283; CCLXXXIII
Ab urbe condita	1036
Assyrian calendar	5033
Balinese saka calendar	204–205
Bengali calendar	−311 – −310
Berber calendar	1233
Buddhist calendar	827
Burmese calendar	−355
Byzantine calendar	5791–5792
Chinese calendar	壬寅年 (Water Tiger); 2980 or 2773 — to — 癸卯年 (Water Rabbit); 2981 or 2774
Coptic calendar	−1 – 0
Discordian calendar	1449
Ethiopian calendar	275–276
Hebrew calendar	4043–4044
- Hindu calendars
Vikram Samvat	339–340
Shaka Samvat	204–205
Kali Yuga	3383–3384
Holocene calendar	10283
Iranian calendar	339 BP – 338 BP
Islamic calendar	349 BH – 348 BH
Javanese calendar	162–163
Julian calendar	283; CCLXXXIII
Korean calendar	2616
Minguo calendar	1629 before ROC 民前1629年
Nanakshahi calendar	−1185
Seleucid era	594/595 AG
Thai solar calendar	825–826
Tibetan calendar	ཆུ་ཕོ་སྟག་ལོ་ (male Water-Tiger); 409 or 28 or −744 — to — ཆུ་མོ་ཡོས་ལོ་ (female Water-Hare); 410 or 29 or −743

Year 283 (CCLXXXIII) was a common year starting on Monday of the Julian calendar. At the time, it was known as the Year of the Consulship of Carus and Carinus (or, less frequently, year 1036 Ab urbe condita). The denomination 283 for this year has been used since the early medieval period, when the Anno Domini calendar era became the prevalent method in Europe for naming years.

== Events ==
=== By place ===
==== Roman Empire ====
- Spring: Emperor Carus makes his son Carinus the Augustus in the west.
- Exploiting the Persian civil war, Carus leaves Carinus in charge of much of the Roman Empire and, accompanied by his younger son Numerian, invades the Sassanid Empire. They sack Seleucia and Ctesiphon, the capital of the Persian kingdom, and they press on beyond the Tigris. For his victories, Carus receives the title of Persicus Maximus.
- The officer Diocles, the future Emperor Diocletian, distinguishes himself in the war against the Persians.
- Carinus campaigns with success in Britain and on the Rhine frontier.
- Summer: Carus dies in mysterious circumstances during the war against the Persians. Various sources claim he died of illness, was struck by lightning or was killed in combat.
- Carinus and Numerian succeed their father Carus. Numerian, who had accompanied his father into the Persian Empire, leads the army back to Roman territory.
- The corrector Aurelius Julianus usurps power in Pannonia but is defeated by Carinus.

==== Persian Empire ====
- The King of Kings Bahram II fights a civil war against his brother Hormizd, the king of Sakastan.

=== By topic ===
==== Religion ====
- December 17 – Pope Caius succeeds Eutychian as the 28th pope of Rome.

== Births ==
- Eusebius of Vercelli, Christian bishop and saint (d. 371)
- Ge Hong, Chinese scholar and philosopher (d. 343)

== Deaths ==
- December 7 – Etychian, bishop of Rome
- Marcus Aurelius Carus, Roman emperor (b. 224)
- Shan Tao, Chinese scholar and politician (b. 205)
- Sima You (or Dayou), Chinese prince (b. 248)
- Sima Zhou (or Zijiang), Chinese prince (b. 227)
