= 260 =

260 in various calendars
- Gregorian calendar: 260; CCLX
- Ab urbe condita: 1013
- Assyrian calendar: 5010
- Balinese saka calendar: 181–182
- Bengali calendar: −334 – −333
- Berber calendar: 1210
- Buddhist calendar: 804
- Burmese calendar: −378
- Byzantine calendar: 5768–5769
- Chinese calendar: 己卯年 (Earth Rabbit); 2957 or 2750 — to — 庚辰年 (Metal Dragon); 2958 or 2751
- Coptic calendar: −24 – −23
- Discordian calendar: 1426
- Ethiopian calendar: 252–253
- Hebrew calendar: 4020–4021
- Hindu calendars
- Vikram Samvat: 316–317
- Shaka Samvat: 181–182
- Kali Yuga: 3360–3361
- Holocene calendar: 10260
- Iranian calendar: 362 BP – 361 BP
- Islamic calendar: 373 BH – 372 BH
- Javanese calendar: 139–140
- Julian calendar: 260; CCLX
- Korean calendar: 2593
- Minguo calendar: 1652 before ROC 民前1652年
- Nanakshahi calendar: −1208
- Seleucid era: 571/572 AG
- Thai solar calendar: 802–803
- Tibetan calendar: ས་མོ་ཡོས་ལོ་ (female Earth-Hare); 386 or 5 or −767 — to — ལྕགས་ཕོ་འབྲུག་ལོ་ (male Iron-Dragon); 387 or 6 or −766

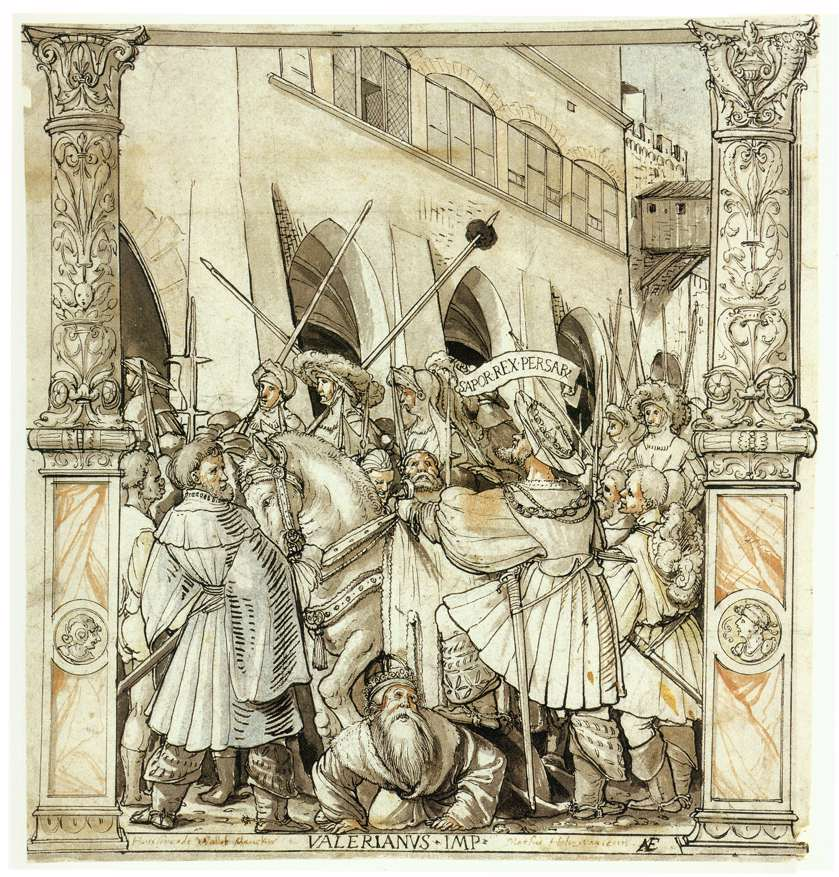
The humiliation of Emperor Valerian (Hans Holbein the Younger, ca. 1521)

Year 260 (CCLX) was a leap year starting on Sunday of the Julian calendar. At the time, it was known as the Year of the Consulship of Saecularis and Donatus (or, less frequently, year 1013 Ab urbe condita). The denomination 260 for this year has been used since the early medieval period, when the Anno Domini calendar era became the prevalent method in Europe for naming years.

== Events ==
=== By place ===
==== Roman Empire ====
- Battle of Edessa: With a large army, said to number 70,000 men, Valerian attempts to drive the Persians back from Edessa. The Roman army is surrounded and most of its troops are killed or captured. Valerian is taken prisoner for the remainder of his life.
- King Shapur I captures Valerian.
- King Shapur I sends Valerian to Bishapur and uses the captured Roman army for engineering plans. They construct the Band-e Kaisar ("Bridge of Valerian").
- Gallienus becomes the sole emperor of Rome; during his reign the Pannonian governor Ingenuus revolts on the Danube.
- Gallienus evacuates the fortifications (limes) in the Agri Decumates (Germania Superior), covering the Black Forest area in the face of invading Alamanni.
- Gallienus establishes himself at Mediolanum (modern Milan); he reorganizes the army, supported by elite cavalry, and dispatches troops to the Rhine frontier.
- Postumus, Roman usurper, forms the Gallic Empire and protects the Rhine against an invasion of Germanic tribes.
- Saloninus, son of Gallienus, is proclaimed Augustus by his troops. Postumus besieges Cologne, where Silvanus is praetorian prefect and Roman ruler of Gaul.
- Postumus executes Saloninus and his adviser Silvanus after breaching the walls of Cologne. He is recognized as emperor and establishes his capital at Trier.
- Postumus wins over all the Roman provinces west of the Alps, including Gaul, Britain and Hispania.
- The Roman fort of Wiesbaden (Germany) is captured by the Alamanni.
- The Franks take control over the Scheldt estuary (approximate date).

==== Persia ====
- Persian king Shapur I destroys Caesarea Mazaca in Asia Minor.

==== China ====
- Emperor Cao Mao of Former Wei state attempts to lead a coup against the powerful regent Sima Zhao, but he himself is killed before it comes to a confrontation.
- June 2 – Cao Mao is killed in a coup d'état against Sima Zhao. The 14-year-old Cao Huan becomes ruler of Former Wei, but the Sima clan controls the state.

=== By topic ===
==== Art and Science ====
- Earliest known date of chess (approximate date).

==== Religion ====
- Pope Dionysius convenes a synod at Rome to demand an explanation from bishop Dionysius of Alexandria, who has been charged with separating the members of the Trinity as three distinct deities.
- Paul of Samosata becomes Patriarch of Antioch.

== Births ==
- Eusebius of Caesarea, Greek bishop and historian (approximate date)

== Deaths ==
- June 2 – Cao Mao, Chinese emperor of the Cao Wei state (b. 241)
- July 2 – Cao Jie, Chinese empress of the Han Dynasty (b. 197)
- Chen Tai (or Xuanbo), Chinese general and politician
- Regalianus (or Regalian), Roman general and usurper
- Saloninus, Roman emperor and son of Gallienus (b.242)
- Shapur Meshanshah, Sasanian prince and governor
- Sun Liang, Chinese emperor of the Eastern Wu state (b. 243)
- Valerianus I, Roman consul and emperor (approximate date)
- Wang Guan (or Weitai), Chinese official and politician
- Wang Jing (or Yanwei), Chinese official and politician
