= 241 =

241 in various calendars
- Gregorian calendar: 241; CCXLI
- Ab urbe condita: 994
- Assyrian calendar: 4991
- Balinese saka calendar: 162–163
- Bengali calendar: −353 – −352
- Berber calendar: 1191
- Buddhist calendar: 785
- Burmese calendar: −397
- Byzantine calendar: 5749–5750
- Chinese calendar: 庚申年 (Metal Monkey); 2938 or 2731 — to — 辛酉年 (Metal Rooster); 2939 or 2732
- Coptic calendar: −43 – −42
- Discordian calendar: 1407
- Ethiopian calendar: 233–234
- Hebrew calendar: 4001–4002
- Hindu calendars
- Vikram Samvat: 297–298
- Shaka Samvat: 162–163
- Kali Yuga: 3341–3342
- Holocene calendar: 10241
- Iranian calendar: 381 BP – 380 BP
- Islamic calendar: 393 BH – 392 BH
- Javanese calendar: 119–120
- Julian calendar: 241; CCXLI
- Korean calendar: 2574
- Minguo calendar: 1671 before ROC 民前1671年
- Nanakshahi calendar: −1227
- Seleucid era: 552/553 AG
- Thai solar calendar: 783–784
- Tibetan calendar: ལྕགས་ཕོ་སྤྲེ་ལོ་ (male Iron-Monkey); 367 or −14 or −786 — to — ལྕགས་མོ་བྱ་ལོ་ (female Iron-Bird); 368 or −13 or −785

Year 241 (CCXLI) was a common year starting on Friday of the Julian calendar. At the time, it was known as the Year of the Consulship of Gordianus and Pompeianus by the Romans (or, less frequently, year 994 Ab urbe condita). The denomination 241 for this year has been used since the early medieval period, when the Anno Domini calendar era became the prevalent method in Europe for naming years.

== Events ==
=== By place ===
==== Roman Empire ====
- Winter – Emperor Gordian III reaches Antioch and, with his army, prepares an offensive against the Sassanids.
- Gaius Furius Sabinius Aquila Timesitheus becomes praetorian prefect and de facto ruler of the Roman Empire.

==== Persia ====
- Prince Shapur I succeeds his father Ardashir I as ruler of the Sassanid Empire. He begins his expansion in India.
- Shapur I annexes parts of the Kushan Empire. The ancient city of Bagram (modern Afghanistan) is abandoned.
- Fall of Hatra: Shapur I captures Hatra, the capital of the Kingdom of Hatra. The city is destroyed by the Sassanids.

==== Europe ====
- November 1 – The Battle of Samhain is fought in Ireland (approximate date).

=== By topic ===
==== Religion ====
- The Dura-Europos church is converted from a house in Syria (approximate date).

== Births ==
- Cao Mao, Chinese emperor of the Cao Wei state in the Three Kingdoms period (d. 260)

== Deaths ==
- Sanatruq II, king of Hatra (Ending of the Kingdom of Hatra)
- Sun Deng, Chinese prince of the Eastern Wu state (b. 209)
- Sun Shao, Chinese general of the Eastern Wu state (b. 188)
- Zhuge Jin, Chinese general of the Eastern Wu state (b. 174)
