= 266 =

266 in various calendars
| Gregorian calendar | 266; CCLXVI |
| Ab urbe condita | 1019 |
| Assyrian calendar | 5016 |
| Balinese saka calendar | 187–188 |
| Bengali calendar | −328 – −327 |
| Berber calendar | 1216 |
| Buddhist calendar | 810 |
| Burmese calendar | −372 |
| Byzantine calendar | 5774–5775 |
| Chinese calendar | 乙酉年 (Wood Rooster); 2963 or 2756 — to — 丙戌年 (Fire Dog); 2964 or 2757 |
| Coptic calendar | −18 – −17 |
| Discordian calendar | 1432 |
| Ethiopian calendar | 258–259 |
| Hebrew calendar | 4026–4027 |
- Hindu calendars
| Vikram Samvat | 322–323 |
| Shaka Samvat | 187–188 |
| Kali Yuga | 3366–3367 |
| Holocene calendar | 10266 |
| Iranian calendar | 356 BP – 355 BP |
| Islamic calendar | 367 BH – 366 BH |
| Javanese calendar | 145–146 |
| Julian calendar | 266; CCLXVI |
| Korean calendar | 2599 |
| Minguo calendar | 1646 before ROC 民前1646年 |
| Nanakshahi calendar | −1202 |
| Seleucid era | 577/578 AG |
| Thai solar calendar | 808–809 |
| Tibetan calendar | 阴木鸡年 (female Wood-Rooster); 392 or 11 or −761 — to — 阳火狗年 (male Fire-Dog); 393 or 12 or −760 |

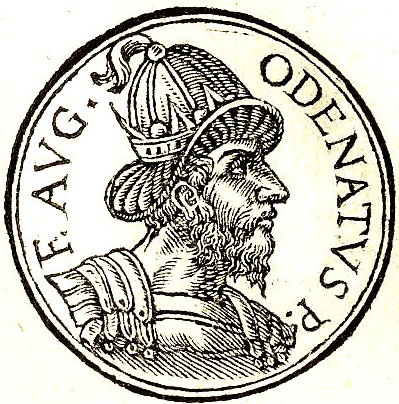
Odaenathus (totius Orientis imperator)

Year 266 (CCLXVI) was a common year starting on Monday of the Julian calendar. At the time, it was known as the Year of the Consulship of Gallienus and Sabinillus (or, less frequently, year 1019 Ab urbe condita). The denomination 266 for this year has been used since the early medieval period, when the Anno Domini calendar era became the prevalent method in Europe for naming years.

== Events ==
=== By place ===
==== Roman Empire ====
- King Odaenathus of Palmyra invades Persia to conquer the capital, Ctesiphon, and twice comes as far as the walls of the Persian capital, but fails to take it. After his victories in the East, he pronounces himself with the title "king of kings".
- A powerful tropical volcanic eruption around this year brings a below-average flood of the Nile next year.

==== Ireland ====
- The rule of High King Cormac mac Airt ends (approximate date).

==== Asia ====
- February 4 – Sima Yan, regent of the Chinese state of Cao Wei, forces the last Cao Wei emperor Cao Huan to abdicate in his favour. The Cao Wei state's existence comes to an end. Sima Yan establishes the Jin Dynasty, and becomes its first emperor on 8 February, and is historically known as "Wu of Jin". He establishes his capital at Luoyang, and gives his male relatives independent military commands throughout his empire.

== Births ==
- Galeria Valeria, Roman empress and wife of Galerius (d. 315)
- Wang Dun (or Chuzhong), Chinese general and warlord (d. 324)
- Zu Ti (or Shizhi), Chinese general and adviser (d. 321)

== Deaths ==
- Wang Chen (or Chudao), Chinese general and politician
- Wang Fan, Chinese astronomer and mathematician (b. 228)
