= 246 =

246 in various calendars
- Gregorian calendar: 246; CCXLVI
- Ab urbe condita: 999
- Assyrian calendar: 4996
- Balinese saka calendar: 167–168
- Bengali calendar: −348 – −347
- Berber calendar: 1196
- Buddhist calendar: 790
- Burmese calendar: −392
- Byzantine calendar: 5754–5755
- Chinese calendar: 乙丑年 (Wood Ox); 2943 or 2736 — to — 丙寅年 (Fire Tiger); 2944 or 2737
- Coptic calendar: −38 – −37
- Discordian calendar: 1412
- Ethiopian calendar: 238–239
- Hebrew calendar: 4006–4007
- Hindu calendars
- Vikram Samvat: 302–303
- Shaka Samvat: 167–168
- Kali Yuga: 3346–3347
- Holocene calendar: 10246
- Iranian calendar: 376 BP – 375 BP
- Islamic calendar: 388 BH – 387 BH
- Javanese calendar: 124–125
- Julian calendar: 246; CCXLVI
- Korean calendar: 2579
- Minguo calendar: 1666 before ROC 民前1666年
- Nanakshahi calendar: −1222
- Seleucid era: 557/558 AG
- Thai solar calendar: 788–789
- Tibetan calendar: ཤིང་མོ་གླང་ལོ་ (female Wood-Ox); 372 or −9 or −781 — to — མེ་ཕོ་སྟག་ལོ་ (male Fire-Tiger); 373 or −8 or −780

Year 246 (CCXLVI) was a common year starting on Thursday of the Julian calendar, the 246th Year of the Common Era (CE) and Anno Domini (AD) designations, the 246th year of the 1st millennium, the 46th year of the 3rd century, and the 7th year of the 240s decade. At the time, it was known as the Year of the Consulship of Praesens and Albinus (or, less frequently, year 999 Ab urbe condita). The denomination 246 for this year has been used since the early medieval period, when the Anno Domini calendar era became the prevalent method in Europe for naming years.

== Events ==
=== By place ===
==== Roman Empire ====
- Emperor Philip the Arab fights the Germans along the Danube River.
- The first of two Councils of Arabia in the Roman Christian Church is held in Bostra, Arabia Petraea.

==== Korea ====
- Baekje Kingdom under King Goi of Baekje attacks the Chinese commandery of Daifang.

== Births ==
- Cao Huan, Chinese emperor of the Cao Wei state (d. 303)

== Deaths ==
- Dong Yun (or Xiuzhao), Chinese general and politician
- Gu Tan (or Zimo), Chinese official and politician (b. 205)
- Jiang Wan (or Gongyan), Chinese general and statesman
