= 228 =

228 in various calendars
- Gregorian calendar: 228; CCXXVIII
- Ab urbe condita: 981
- Assyrian calendar: 4978
- Balinese saka calendar: 149–150
- Bengali calendar: −366 – −365
- Berber calendar: 1178
- Buddhist calendar: 772
- Burmese calendar: −410
- Byzantine calendar: 5736–5737
- Chinese calendar: 丁未年 (Fire Goat); 2925 or 2718 — to — 戊申年 (Earth Monkey); 2926 or 2719
- Coptic calendar: −56 – −55
- Discordian calendar: 1394
- Ethiopian calendar: 220–221
- Hebrew calendar: 3988–3989
- Hindu calendars
- Vikram Samvat: 284–285
- Shaka Samvat: 149–150
- Kali Yuga: 3328–3329
- Holocene calendar: 10228
- Iranian calendar: 394 BP – 393 BP
- Islamic calendar: 406 BH – 405 BH
- Javanese calendar: 106–107
- Julian calendar: 228; CCXXVIII
- Korean calendar: 2561
- Minguo calendar: 1684 before ROC 民前1684年
- Nanakshahi calendar: −1240
- Seleucid era: 539/540 AG
- Thai solar calendar: 770–771
- Tibetan calendar: མེ་མོ་ལུག་ལོ་ (female Fire-Sheep); 354 or −27 or −799 — to — ས་ཕོ་སྤྲེ་ལོ་ (male Earth-Monkey); 355 or −26 or −798

Year 228 (CCXXVIII) was a leap year starting on Tuesday of the Julian calendar. At the time, it was known as the Year of the Consulship of Modestus and Maecius (or, less frequently, year 981 Ab urbe condita). The denomination 228 for this year has been used since the early medieval period, when the Anno Domini calendar era became the prevalent method in Europe for naming years.

== Events ==
=== By place ===
==== Roman Empire ====
- Domitius Ulpianus, a Roman jurist and prefect, is assassinated by the Praetorian Guard, in the presence of Emperor Severus Alexander. His curtailment of the privileges of the palace guard becomes Ulpianus' downfall, who in the course of a riot at Rome is murdered, between the soldiers and the mob.

==== Persian Empire ====
- King Ardashir I, four years after establishing the Sassanid Persian Empire, completes his conquest of Parthia.

==== China ====
- c. February – May – Battle of Jieting: The Cao Wei Kingdom decisively defeats the Shu Han Kingdom.
- June –October – Battle of Shiting: The Eastern Wu Kingdom defeats the Cao Wei Kingdom.

== Births ==
- Paul of Thebes, Christian hermit (approximate date)
- Wang Fan, Chinese politician and astronomer (d. 266)

== Deaths ==
- Cao Xiu, Chinese general of the Cao Wei state
- Domitius Ulpianus, Roman jurist and prefect (b. 170)
- Jia Kui, Chinese general of the Cao Wei state (b. 174)
- Lü Fan, Chinese general of the Eastern Wu state
- Luo Tong, Chinese official and general (b. 193)
- Ma Su, Chinese general of the Shu Han state (b. 190)
- Meng Da, Chinese general of the Cao Wei state
- Wang Lang, Chinese official of the Cao Wei state
- Zhuge Qiao, Chinese official and general (b. 204)

== See also ==
- 2nd Battalion 28th Marines (often simply referred as 2/28).
- February 28 Incident (referred to in Chinese as "228").
