= 227 =

227 in various calendars
- Gregorian calendar: 227; CCXXVII
- Ab urbe condita: 980
- Assyrian calendar: 4977
- Balinese saka calendar: 148–149
- Bengali calendar: −367 – −366
- Berber calendar: 1177
- Buddhist calendar: 771
- Burmese calendar: −411
- Byzantine calendar: 5735–5736
- Chinese calendar: 丙午年 (Fire Horse); 2924 or 2717 — to — 丁未年 (Fire Goat); 2925 or 2718
- Coptic calendar: −57 – −56
- Discordian calendar: 1393
- Ethiopian calendar: 219–220
- Hebrew calendar: 3987–3988
- Hindu calendars
- Vikram Samvat: 283–284
- Shaka Samvat: 148–149
- Kali Yuga: 3327–3328
- Holocene calendar: 10227
- Iranian calendar: 395 BP – 394 BP
- Islamic calendar: 407 BH – 406 BH
- Javanese calendar: 105–106
- Julian calendar: 227; CCXXVII
- Korean calendar: 2560
- Minguo calendar: 1685 before ROC 民前1685年
- Nanakshahi calendar: −1241
- Seleucid era: 538/539 AG
- Thai solar calendar: 769–770
- Tibetan calendar: མེ་ཕོ་རྟ་ལོ་ (male Fire-Horse); 353 or −28 or −800 — to — མེ་མོ་ལུག་ལོ་ (female Fire-Sheep); 354 or −27 or −799

Year 227 (CCXXVII) was a common year starting on Monday of the Julian calendar. At the time, it was known as the Year of the Consulship of Senecio and Fulvius (or, less frequently, year 980 Ab urbe condita). The denomination 227 for this year has been used since the early medieval period, when the Anno Domini calendar era became the prevalent method in Europe for naming years.

== Events ==
=== By place ===
==== Roman Empire ====
- Seius Sallustius is executed for the attempted murder of his son-in-law, Emperor Alexander Severus. Sallustius' daughter, as well as Alexander's wife, Sallustia Orbiana, is exiled to Libya.

==== Ireland ====
- The rule of High King Cormac mac Airt begins (approximate).

==== Persian Empire ====
- King Ardashir I annexes his new empire from the east to the northwest. He conquers, with his army, the provinces of Chorasmia, Sistan and the island Bahrain in the Persian Gulf. The kings of the Kushan Empire and Turan recognize Ardashir as their overlord.

==== Asia ====
- Dongcheon becomes ruler over the Korean kingdom of Goguryeo.

== Births ==
- Herennius Etruscus, Roman emperor (d. 251)
- Sima Zhou, Chinese prince and general (d. 283)
- Zhuge Zhan, Chinese general and official (d. 263)

== Deaths ==
- Han Dang (or Yigong), Chinese general
- He Qi (or Gongmiao), Chinese general
- Seius Sallustius, Roman usurper (Caesar)
- Shi Hui, Chinese official and general (b. 165)
- Xu Huang (or Gongming), Chinese general
