= AD 174 =

174 in various calendars
- Gregorian calendar: 174; CLXXIV
- Ab urbe condita: 927
- Assyrian calendar: 4924
- Balinese saka calendar: 95–96
- Bengali calendar: −420 – −419
- Berber calendar: 1124
- Buddhist calendar: 718
- Burmese calendar: −464
- Byzantine calendar: 5682–5683
- Chinese calendar: 癸丑年 (Water Ox); 2871 or 2664 — to — 甲寅年 (Wood Tiger); 2872 or 2665
- Coptic calendar: −110 – −109
- Discordian calendar: 1340
- Ethiopian calendar: 166–167
- Hebrew calendar: 3934–3935
- Hindu calendars
- Vikram Samvat: 230–231
- Shaka Samvat: 95–96
- Kali Yuga: 3274–3275
- Holocene calendar: 10174
- Iranian calendar: 448 BP – 447 BP
- Islamic calendar: 462 BH – 461 BH
- Javanese calendar: 50–51
- Julian calendar: 174; CLXXIV
- Korean calendar: 2507
- Minguo calendar: 1738 before ROC 民前1738年
- Nanakshahi calendar: −1294
- Seleucid era: 485/486 AG
- Thai solar calendar: 716–717
- Tibetan calendar: ཆུ་མོ་གླང་ལོ་ (female Water-Ox); 300 or −81 or −853 — to — ཤིང་ཕོ་སྟག་ལོ་ (male Wood-Tiger); 301 or −80 or −852

Year 174 (CLXXIV) was a common year starting on Friday of the Julian calendar. At the time, it was known as the Year of the Consulship of Gallus and Flaccus (or, less frequently, year 927 Ab urbe condita). The denomination 174 for this year has been used since the early medieval period, when the Anno Domini calendar era became the prevalent method in Europe for naming years.

== Events ==
=== By place ===
==== Roman Empire ====
- Empress Faustina the Younger accompanies her husband, Marcus Aurelius, on various military campaigns and enjoys the love of the Roman soldiers. Aurelius gives her the title of Mater Castrorum ("Mother of the Camp").
- Marcus Aurelius officially confers the title Fulminata ("Thundering") to the Legio XII Fulminata.

==== Asia ====
- Reign in India of Yajnashri Satakarni, Satavahana king of the Andhra. He extends his empire from the center to the north of India.

=== By topic ===
==== Art and Science ====
- Meditations by Marcus Aurelius is written, in Greek, while on military campaigns in Pannonia (approximate date).

==== Religion ====
- Pope Eleuterus succeeds Pope Soter as the thirteenth pope (approximate date).

== Births ==
- Gao Rou, Chinese general and politician (d. 263)
- Jia Kui, Chinese general and politician (d. 228)
- Tuoba Liwei, Chinese leader of the Tuoba clan (d. 277)
- Zhuge Jin, Chinese general and politician (d. 241)

== Deaths ==
- Soter (or Sorterius), bishop of Rome (approximate date)
- Tiberius Julius Eupator, Roman client king
