= 263 =

263 in various calendars
- Gregorian calendar: 263; CCLXIII
- Ab urbe condita: 1016
- Assyrian calendar: 5013
- Balinese saka calendar: 184–185
- Bengali calendar: −331 – −330
- Berber calendar: 1213
- Buddhist calendar: 807
- Burmese calendar: −375
- Byzantine calendar: 5771–5772
- Chinese calendar: 壬午年 (Water Horse); 2960 or 2753 — to — 癸未年 (Water Goat); 2961 or 2754
- Coptic calendar: −21 – −20
- Discordian calendar: 1429
- Ethiopian calendar: 255–256
- Hebrew calendar: 4023–4024
- Hindu calendars
- Vikram Samvat: 319–320
- Shaka Samvat: 184–185
- Kali Yuga: 3363–3364
- Holocene calendar: 10263
- Iranian calendar: 359 BP – 358 BP
- Islamic calendar: 370 BH – 369 BH
- Javanese calendar: 142–143
- Julian calendar: 263; CCLXIII
- Korean calendar: 2596
- Minguo calendar: 1649 before ROC 民前1649年
- Nanakshahi calendar: −1205
- Seleucid era: 574/575 AG
- Thai solar calendar: 805–806
- Tibetan calendar: ཆུ་ཕོ་རྟ་ལོ་ (male Water-Horse); 389 or 8 or −764 — to — ཆུ་མོ་ལུག་ལོ་ (female Water-Sheep); 390 or 9 or −763

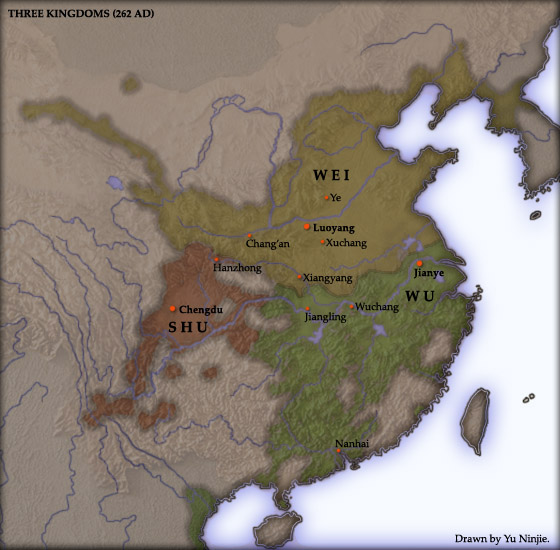
Three Kingdoms (China)

Year 263 (CCLXIII) was a common year starting on Thursday of the Julian calendar. At the time, it was known as the Year of the Consulship of Albinus and Dexter (or, less frequently, year 1016 Ab urbe condita). The denomination 263 for this year has been used since the early medieval period, when the Anno Domini calendar era became the prevalent method in Europe for naming years.

== Events ==
=== By place ===
==== Roman Empire ====
- King Odenathus of Palmyra declares himself ruler of the area west of the River Euphrates and is declared Dux Orientalis by the Roman emperor Gallienus.

==== Asia ====
- Conquest of Shu by Wei: The Chinese state of Cao Wei conquers Shu Han, one of its two rival states.
- Sima Zhao, regent of the Cao Wei state, receives and accepts the nine bestowments, state chancellorship, and the title Duke of Jin from Cao Huan.

=== By topic ===
==== Art and Science ====
- Chinese mathematician Liu Hui writes a commentary on The Nine Chapters on the Mathematical Art, describing what will later be called Gaussian elimination, computing pi, etc.

== Deaths ==
- Gao Rou (or Wenhui), Chinese politician (b. 174)
- Lady Li (or Lishi), Chinese noblewoman
- Liu Chen, Chinese prince of the Shu Han state
- Ruan Ji, Chinese poet and musician (b. 210)
- Zhuge Zhan, Chinese general and politician (b. 227)
