= AD 100 =

AD 100 in various calendars
- Gregorian calendar: AD 100; C
- Ab urbe condita: 853
- Assyrian calendar: 4850
- Balinese saka calendar: 21–22
- Bengali calendar: −494 – −493
- Berber calendar: 1050
- Buddhist calendar: 644
- Burmese calendar: −538
- Byzantine calendar: 5608–5609
- Chinese calendar: 己亥年 (Earth Pig); 2797 or 2590 — to — 庚子年 (Metal Rat); 2798 or 2591
- Coptic calendar: −184 – −183
- Discordian calendar: 1266
- Ethiopian calendar: 92–93
- Hebrew calendar: 3860–3861
- Hindu calendars
- Vikram Samvat: 156–157
- Shaka Samvat: 21–22
- Kali Yuga: 3200–3201
- Holocene calendar: 10100
- Iranian calendar: 522 BP – 521 BP
- Islamic calendar: 538 BH – 537 BH
- Javanese calendar: N/A
- Julian calendar: AD 100; C
- Korean calendar: 2433
- Minguo calendar: 1812 before ROC 民前1812年
- Nanakshahi calendar: −1368
- Seleucid era: 411/412 AG
- Thai solar calendar: 642–643
- Tibetan calendar: ས་མོ་ཕག་ལོ་ (female Earth-Boar); 226 or −155 or −927 — to — ལྕགས་ཕོ་བྱི་བ་ལོ་ (male Iron-Rat); 227 or −154 or −926

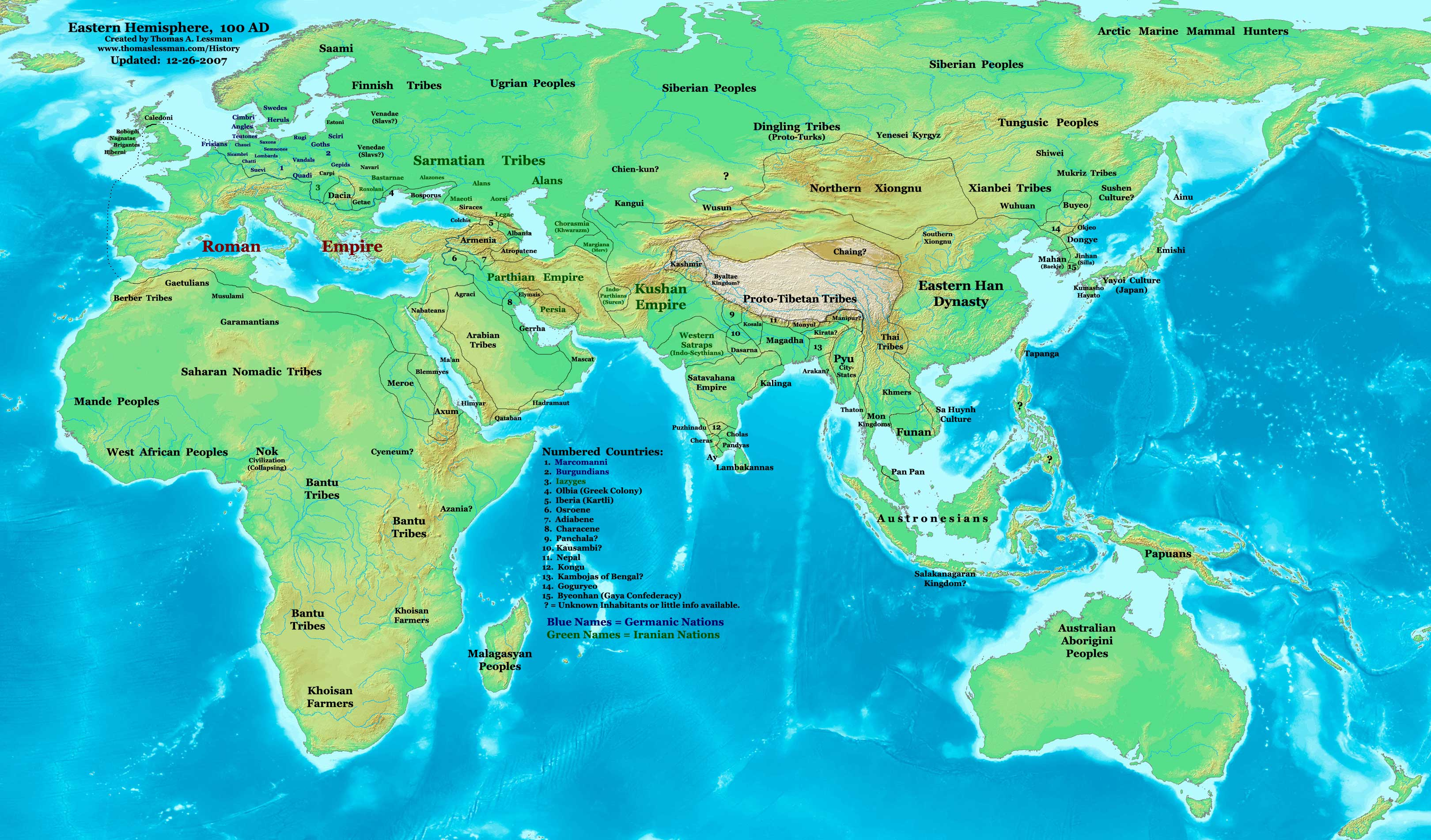
The Eastern Hemisphere in AD 100

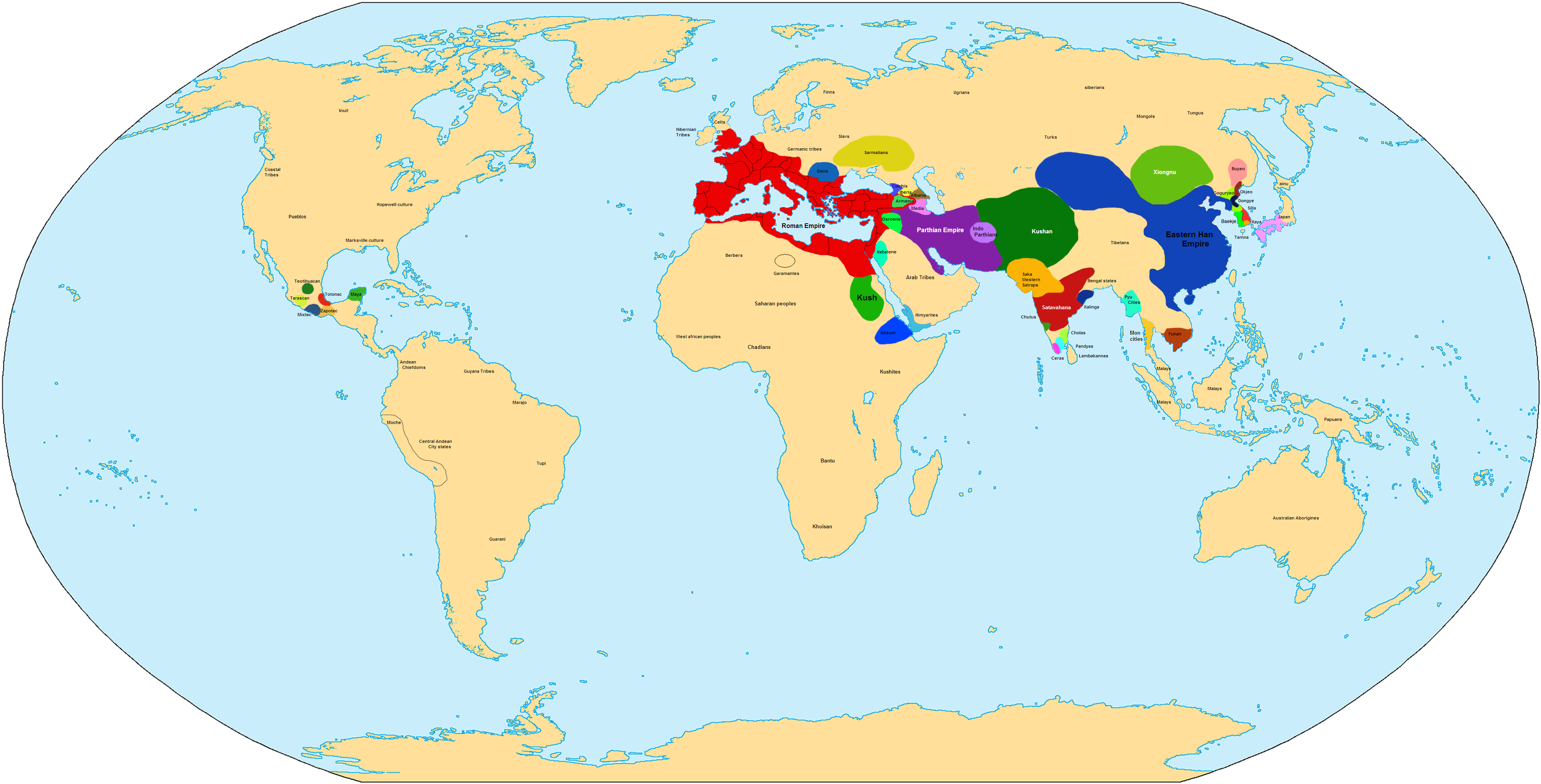
The world in AD 100

100 (C) was a leap year starting on Wednesday of the Julian calendar, the 100th year of the Common Era (CE) and Anno Domini (AD) designations, the 100th year of the 1st millennium, the 100th and last year of the 1st century, and the 1st year of the 100s decade. As of the start of 100, the Gregorian calendar was 2 days behind the Julian calendar, which was the dominant calendar of the time.

In the Roman Empire, it was sometimes referred to as year 853 ab urbe condita, i.e., 853 years since the founding of Rome in 753 B.C. The denomination AD 100 for this year has been used since the Early Middle Ages, when the Anno Domini calendar era became the prevalent method in Europe for naming years.

This year saw Pacores, the last king of the Indo-Parthian kingdom, ascend to the throne. In the Americas, the Moche culture developed around this time, and Teotihuacan, a major city at the centre of modern-day Mexico, reached a population of around 60,000–80,000.

== Events ==
=== By place ===
==== Roman Empire ====
- Emperor Trajan and Frontinus become Roman consuls.
- Bricks become the primary building material in the Roman Empire.
- Pliny the Younger advances to consulship, giving his panegyric on Trajan in the process.
- The Imperial Roman army reaches 300,000 soldiers.
- Titus Avidius Quietus' rule as governor of Roman Britain ends.
- Timgad (Thamugas), a Roman colonial town in North Africa, is founded by Trajan.
- Trajan creates a policy intended to restore the former economic supremacy of Italy.
- The future emperor, Hadrian, marries Vibia Sabina.

==== Europe ====
- Lions have become extinct in Greece by this year.

==== Asia ====
- Pacores (last king of the Indo-Parthian kingdom) takes the throne.
- Paper is used by the general populace in China, starting around this year.

==== Americas ====
- The Hopewell tradition roughly begins in what is now Ohio.
- Teotihuacan, a major city at the centre of modern-day Mexico, reaches a population of around 60,000–80,000.
- The Moche culture emerges, and starts building a society in present-day Peru.

=== By topic ===
==== Arts and sciences ====
- In China, the wheelbarrow makes its first appearance.
- Main hall, Trajan's Market, Rome, is made (until AD 112).

==== Religion ====
- Appearance of the first Christian dogma and formulas regarding morality.
- The Gospel of John is widely believed to have been written around this date.
- The compilation of the Kama Sutra begins in India.
- The Temple of the God of Medicine is built in Anguo, China.
- The Fourth Buddhist Council is convened in Jalandhara, Punjab.

== Births ==
- Fa Zhen (or Gaoqing), Chinese scholar (d. 188)
- Approximate date
  - Faustina the Elder, Roman empress (d. 140)
  - Justin Martyr, Christian apologist and saint (d. 165)
  - Marcus Cornelius Fronto, Roman grammarian, rhetorician and advocate (d. 170)
  - Ptolemy, Greek astrologer, astronomer, geographer and mathematician (d. 170)
  - Quintus Junius Rusticus, Roman teacher and politician (d. 170)
  - Quintus Tineius Sacerdos Clemens, Roman politician (d. 170)

== Deaths ==
- Herod Agrippa II, Jewish king of Judea (b. AD 27)
- Apollonius of Tyana, Greek philosopher (b. AD 15)
- Josephus, Jewish historian and writer (b. AD 37)
- John the Apostle of Jesus Christ (approximate date, b. AD 6)
- Wang Chong, Chinese philosopher (b. AD 27)
