= 239 =

239 in various calendars
Gregorian calendar	239; CCXXXIX
Ab urbe condita	992
Assyrian calendar	4989
Balinese saka calendar	160–161
Bengali calendar	−355 – −354
Berber calendar	1189
Buddhist calendar	783
Burmese calendar	−399
Byzantine calendar	5747–5748
Chinese calendar	戊午年 (Earth Horse); 2936 or 2729 — to — 己未年 (Earth Goat); 2937 or 2730
Coptic calendar	−45 – −44
Discordian calendar	1405
Ethiopian calendar	231–232
Hebrew calendar	3999–4000
- Hindu calendars
Vikram Samvat	295–296
Shaka Samvat	160–161
Kali Yuga	3339–3340
Holocene calendar	10239
Iranian calendar	383 BP – 382 BP
Islamic calendar	395 BH – 394 BH
Javanese calendar	117–118
Julian calendar	239; CCXXXIX
Korean calendar	2572
Minguo calendar	1673 before ROC 民前1673年
Nanakshahi calendar	−1229
Seleucid era	550/551 AG
Thai solar calendar	781–782
Tibetan calendar	阳土马年 (male Earth-Horse); 365 or −16 or −788 — to — 阴土羊年 (female Earth-Goat); 366 or −15 or −787

Year 239 (CCXXXIX) was a common year starting on Tuesday of the Julian calendar. At the time, it was known as the Year of the Consulship of Gordianus and Aviola (or, less frequently, year 992 Ab urbe condita). The denomination 239 for this year has been used since the early medieval period, when the Anno Domini calendar era became the prevalent method in Europe for naming years.

== Events ==
=== By place ===
==== Asia ====
- Cao Fang succeeds his adoptive father Cao Rui as emperor of the Cao Wei state, in the Three Kingdoms period of China.
- A Chinese expeditionary force from the Eastern Wu state discovers the island of Taiwan.
- Queen of Yamataikoku (Japan), Himiko was given Golden signature stamp by Cao Wei (China)

=== By topic ===
==== Religion ====
- Origen publishes the Old Testament in five languages (approximate date).

== Deaths ==
- January 22 – Cao Rui (or Yuanzhong), Chinese emperor (b. 206)
- Lu Mao (or Zizhang), Chinese official and politician
- Pan Jun (or Chengming), Chinese official and general
