= 330 =

330 in various calendars
- Gregorian calendar: 330; CCCXXX
- Ab urbe condita: 1083
- Assyrian calendar: 5080
- Balinese saka calendar: 251–252
- Bengali calendar: −264 – −263
- Berber calendar: 1280
- Buddhist calendar: 874
- Burmese calendar: −308
- Byzantine calendar: 5838–5839
- Chinese calendar: 己丑年 (Earth Ox); 3027 or 2820 — to — 庚寅年 (Metal Tiger); 3028 or 2821
- Coptic calendar: 46–47
- Discordian calendar: 1496
- Ethiopian calendar: 322–323
- Hebrew calendar: 4090–4091
- Hindu calendars
- Vikram Samvat: 386–387
- Shaka Samvat: 251–252
- Kali Yuga: 3430–3431
- Holocene calendar: 10330
- Iranian calendar: 292 BP – 291 BP
- Islamic calendar: 301 BH – 300 BH
- Javanese calendar: 211–212
- Julian calendar: 330; CCCXXX
- Korean calendar: 2663
- Minguo calendar: 1582 before ROC 民前1582年
- Nanakshahi calendar: −1138
- Seleucid era: 641/642 AG
- Thai solar calendar: 872–873
- Tibetan calendar: ས་མོ་གླང་ལོ་ (female Earth-Ox); 456 or 75 or −697 — to — ལྕགས་ཕོ་སྟག་ལོ་ (male Iron-Tiger); 457 or 76 or −696

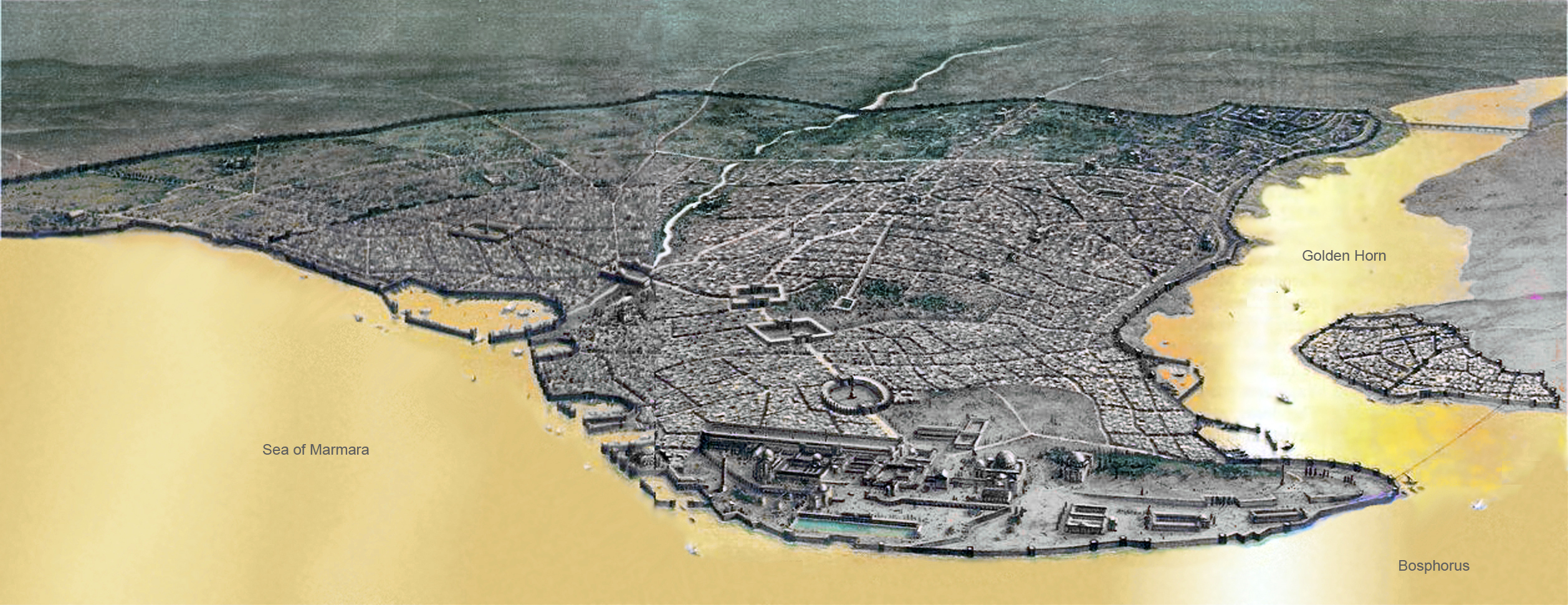
Constantinople from the sky

Year 330 (CCCXXX) was a common year starting on Thursday of the Julian calendar. At the time, it was known as the Year of the Consulship of Gallicanus and Tullianus (or, less frequently, year 1083 Ab urbe condita). The denomination 330 for this year has been used since the early medieval period, when the Anno Domini calendar era became the prevalent method in Europe for naming years.

== Events ==
=== By place ===
==== Roman Empire ====
- May 11 – Emperor Constantine the Great dedicates the Column of Constantine and Constantinople, or Nova Roma (modern-day Istanbul). He had spent four years expanding the city of Byzantium, having chosen the site for its strategic location on the Bosporus. The city became the capital of the Byzantine Empire.
- The Goths devastate the city of Tanais, in the Don River Delta.

==== Africa ====
- Ezana at around this time converted to Christianity, making it Aksum's state religion. This makes Aksum the second state to convert to Christianity, after Armenia

=== By topic ===
==== Religion ====
- Frumentius is the first bishop of Ethiopia (approximate date).
- Eustathius, Patriarch of Antioch, is banished to Trajanopolis.
- The Bible is translated into the Gothic language by Wulfila.
- Pagan temples begin to be progressively abandoned, destroyed or left to fall into disrepair, save those that are transformed into churches.

== Births ==
- Ammianus Marcellinus, Graeco-Roman historian (approximate date)
- Basil the Great, bishop of Caesarea Mazaca (d. 379)
- Macrina the Younger, Christian nun and saint (d. 379)
- Moses the Black, Christian monk and priest (d. 405)
- Victricius, Christian missionary and bishop of Rouen (d. c. 407)
- Yang Xi, Chinese scholar and calligrapher (d. 386)

== Deaths ==
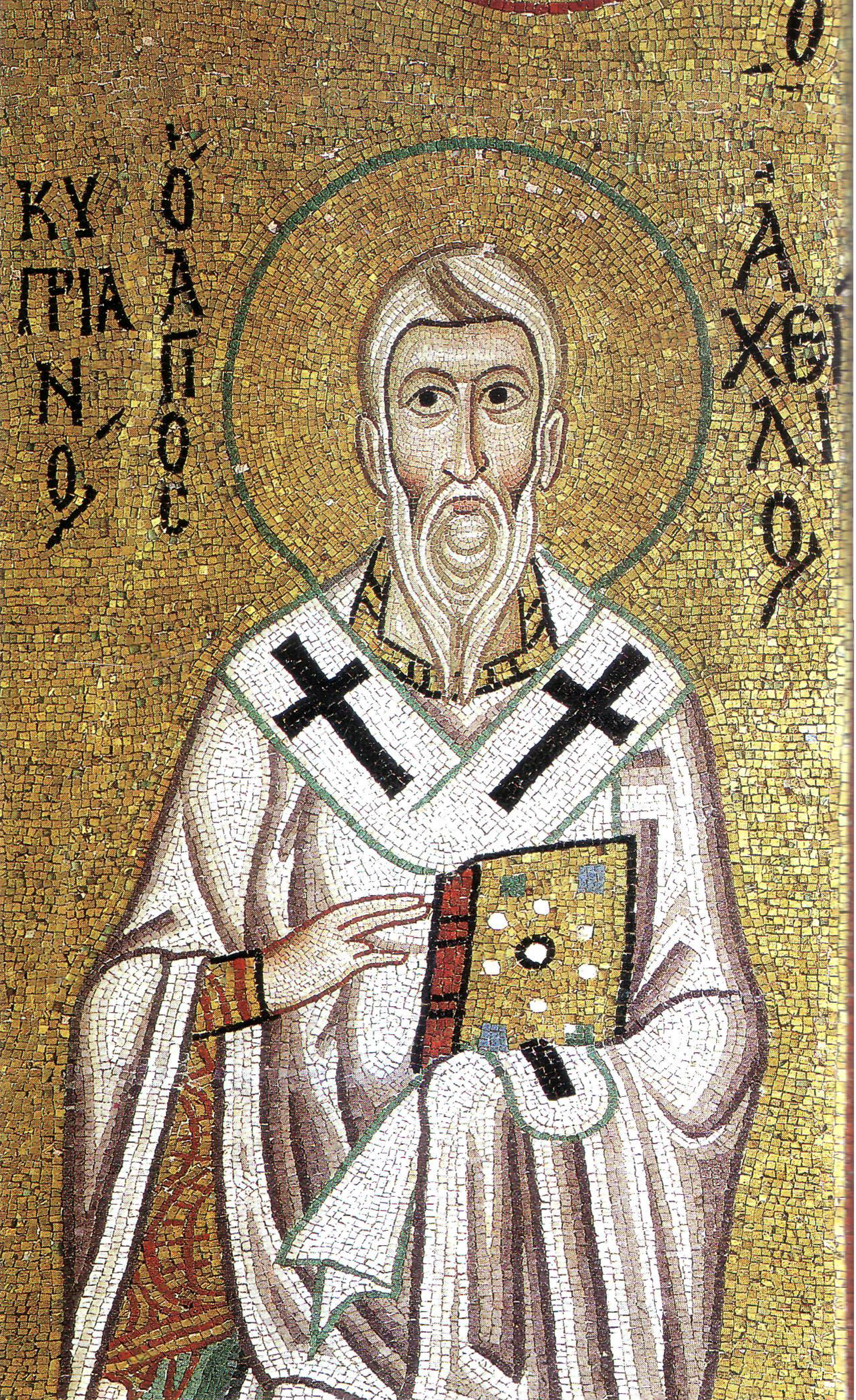
Saint Achillius of Larissa

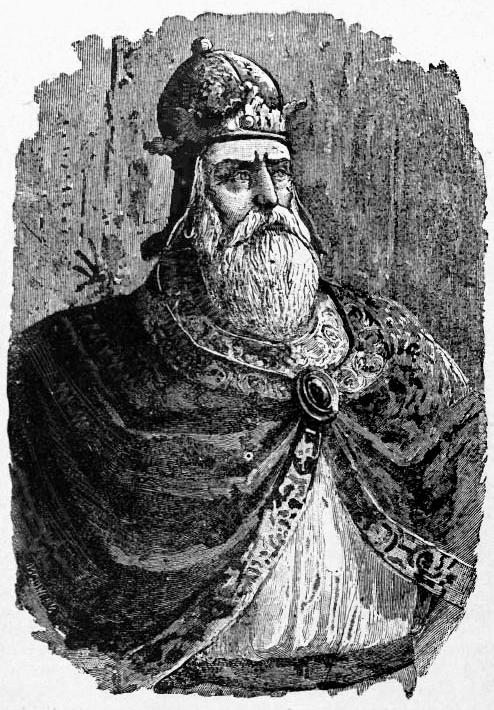
Saint Tiridates III

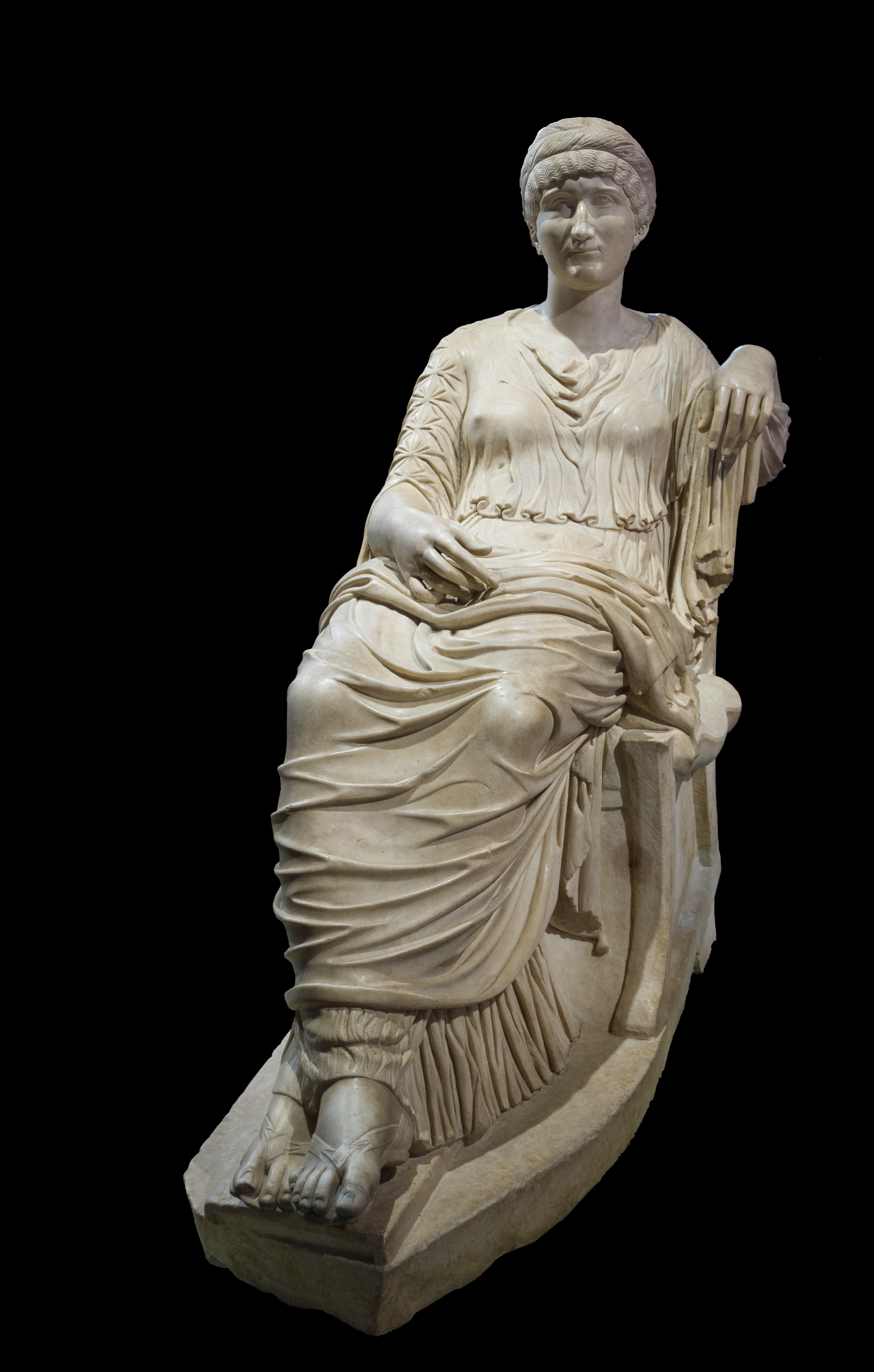
Saint Helena

- Achillius of Larissa (or Achilles), Greek bishop
- Arnobius, Numidian apologist and writer
- Guo Mo, Chinese general and warlord
- Helena (Augusta), mother of Constantine I
- Tiridates III ("the Great"), king of Armenia
- Vicinius of Sarsina, Italian Christian bishop
- Zu Yue, Chinese general and warlord
