= 270 =

270 in various calendars
- Gregorian calendar: 270; CCLXX
- Ab urbe condita: 1023
- Assyrian calendar: 5020
- Balinese saka calendar: 191–192
- Bengali calendar: −324 – −323
- Berber calendar: 1220
- Buddhist calendar: 814
- Burmese calendar: −368
- Byzantine calendar: 5778–5779
- Chinese calendar: 己丑年 (Earth Ox); 2967 or 2760 — to — 庚寅年 (Metal Tiger); 2968 or 2761
- Coptic calendar: −14 – −13
- Discordian calendar: 1436
- Ethiopian calendar: 262–263
- Hebrew calendar: 4030–4031
- Hindu calendars
- Vikram Samvat: 326–327
- Shaka Samvat: 191–192
- Kali Yuga: 3370–3371
- Holocene calendar: 10270
- Iranian calendar: 352 BP – 351 BP
- Islamic calendar: 363 BH – 362 BH
- Javanese calendar: 149–150
- Julian calendar: 270; CCLXX
- Korean calendar: 2603
- Minguo calendar: 1642 before ROC 民前1642年
- Nanakshahi calendar: −1198
- Seleucid era: 581/582 AG
- Thai solar calendar: 812–813
- Tibetan calendar: ས་མོ་གླང་ལོ་ (female Earth-Ox); 396 or 15 or −757 — to — ལྕགས་ཕོ་སྟག་ལོ་ (male Iron-Tiger); 397 or 16 or −756

Year 270 (CCLXX) was a common year starting on Saturday of the Julian calendar. At the time, it was known as the Year of the Consulship of Antiochianus and Orfitus (or, less frequently, year 1023 Ab urbe condita). The denomination 270 for this year has been used since the early medieval period, when the Anno Domini calendar era became the prevalent method in Europe for naming years.

== Events ==
=== By place ===
==== Roman Empire ====
- Emperor Claudius II Gothicus fights a drawn-out campaign against the Gothic raiders in the Balkans, with setbacks suffered on both sides. Eventually, many Goths die of plague and others are absorbed into the Roman legions.
- Zenobia seizes control of Roman Arabia and Egypt.
- Claudius dies of plague in Sirmium while preparing to fight the Vandals and Sarmatians, who have invaded Pannonia. He is succeeded by his brother Quintillus, who briefly holds power over the Roman Empire.
- Victorinus besieges and sacks the city of Autun, which had declared allegiance to Claudius.
- Lucius Domitius Aurelianus (or Aurelian), the cavalry commander who distinguished himself in the previous year at the Battle of Naissus (Serbia), usurps power in Sirmium and marches against Quintillus in Aquileia. Quintillus commits suicide.
- Aurelius defeats an incursion by the Iuthungi into Raetia, defeating them as they attempted to re-cross the Danube.

==== Asia ====
- Fan Hsiung, a.k.a. Pham Hung, comes to power in Champa and raids the Chinese-occupied territory of Tonkin.
- Seocheon becomes ruler of the Korean kingdom of Goguryeo.

==== Africa ====
- The Kingdom of Aksum (modern Ethiopia) begins minting its own gold coins to facilitate international trade, following the model of Roman coinage.
- Anthony the Great, a Christian saint from Egypt, regarded as "Father of All Monks", enters the wilderness to become ascetic.

== Births ==
- March 15 – Saint Nicholas (Santa Claus) (d. 343)
- Liu Kun, Chinese general and poet (d. 318)
- Rabbah bar Nahmani, Babylonian 'amora
- Saint Spyridon, bishop of Trimythous (d. 348)

== Deaths ==
- Claudius II (Gothicus), Roman emperor (b. 214)
- Gregory Thaumaturgus, Christian bishop and theologian
- Luo Xian (or Lingze), Chinese general and politician
- Plotinus, Greek philosopher and founder Neoplatonism
- Qiao Zhou (or Yunnan), Chinese official and politician
- Quintillus, Roman emperor and brother of Claudius II
- Shapur I (the Great), ruler of the Sassanid Empire
- Shi Ji (or Zhu Ji), Chinese general and governor
- Sun Fen, Chinese prince of the Eastern Wu state
