= 350s =

Decade

The 350s decade ran from January 1, 350, to December 31, 359.

== Events ==
=== By place ===
==== Roman Empire ====
- January 18 – Western Roman Emperor Constans I makes himself extremely unpopular; one of his generals, Magnentius, is proclaimed emperor at Augustodunum in the Diocese of Galliae, with the support of the army on the Rhine frontier.
- January – Constans I flees towards Spain, where he is subsequently assassinated at Castrum Helenae. Magnentius rules the Western portion of the Roman Empire and is far more tolerant towards Christians and Pagans alike.
- March 1 – Vetranio is asked by Constantina, sister of Constantius II, to proclaim himself Caesar. Constantius accepts the new emperor and sends him funds to raise an army.
- June 3 – Nepotianus, Roman usurper, proclaims himself emperor and enters Rome with a group of gladiators.
- June 30 – Nepotianus is defeated and killed by Marcellinus, a trusted general sent by Magnentius. His head is put on a spear and carried around the city.
- December 25 – Vetranio meets Constantius II at Naissus (Serbia) and joins forces with him. Vetranio is forced to abdicate his title, and Constantius allows him to live as a private citizen on a state pension.

==== Asia ====
- King Pushyavarman establishes the Varman Dynasty in Assam.
- About this time the Huns begin to invade the Sassanid Empire.
- The city of Anbar (Iraq) is founded by king Shapur II.
- The Ran Wei-Later Zhao war breaks out in North China. Ethnic Han ruler Ran Min had used the infighting between the brothers who reigned in quick succession as emperors of the Jie state of the Later Zhao to assume power, establish the Ran Wei dynasty, have an alleged 200,000 non-Han subjects (mostly Jie and Xiongnu) massacred and end the Later Zhao dynasty. This situation will soon be exploited by the neighbouring state of Former Yan which expands from the northeast towards the Yellow River.

=== By topic ===
==== Art ====
- The church of Santa Constanza in Rome is finished.

=== By place ===
==== Roman Empire ====
- March 15 – Emperor Constantius II elevates his 25-year-old cousin Constantius Gallus to Caesar at Sirmium (Pannonia). He arranges a marriage with his sister Constantina, and puts him in charge of the Eastern portion of the Roman Empire.
- Constantius II marches West with a large field army (around 60,000 men) to topple Magnus Magnentius in Pannonia.
- May 7 – The Jewish revolt against Constantius Gallus breaks out. After his arrival at Antioch, the Jews begin a rebellion in Palestine. The Roman garrison in the town of Diocesarea is wiped out.
- September 28 – Battle of Mursa Major: Constantius II defeats the usurper Magnentius along the valley of the Drava. The battle is one of the bloodiest in Roman military history. During the fighting Marcellinus, a general of Magnentius is killed; Magnentius himself survives.
- Winter – Magnentius flees to Aquileia in northern Italy and fortifies the mountain passes in the Alps.

==== China ====
- Emperor Shi Zhi, last ruler of the Later Zhao dynasty, is killed by Ran Min's forces, an action that sets the stage for Wei's victory in the Ran Wei–Later Zhao war.
- Fú Jiàn, an ethnic Di, declares himself "Heavenly Prince" (Tian Wang) during the collapse of Later Zhao, and establishes Former Qin.

=== By topic ===
==== Art and Science ====
- In India, a new process makes possible the extraction of sugar from sugarcane.

==== Religion ====
- Macedonius is restored as Patriarch of Constantinople.

=== By place ===
==== Roman Empire ====
- Emperor Constantius II invades northern Italy in pursuit of the usurper Magnus Magnentius, who withdraws with his army to Gaul. He declares an amnesty for Magnentius' soldiers, many of whom desert to him.
- By the end of the year Constantius enters Milan.
- The Alamanni and the Franks cross the Rhine and defeat the depleted Roman units left at the frontier. The Germans take control of around 40 towns and cities between the Moselle and the Rhine.
- Constantius Gallus sends his general (magister equitum) Ursicinus to forcefully put down the Jewish revolt in Palestine. The rebels destroy the cities Diopolis and Tiberias, while Diocesarea is razed to the ground. Ursicinus gives the order to kill thousands of Jews, even children. After the revolt, a permanent garrison is stationed in Galilee.

==== Asia ====
- War begins between the Huns and the Alans.
- Ran Wei is destroyed after Ran Min is killed by Murong Jun, the Xianbei emperor of the Former Yan.

=== By topic ===
==== Art and Science ====
- The earliest sighting of a supernova occurs in China.

==== Religion ====
- May 17 – Pope Julius I dies after a 15-year reign in which he has made himself the chief opponent of Arianism. He is succeeded by Pope Liberius as the 36th pope, who immediately writes to Constantius II requesting a council at Aquileia to discuss the former Alexandrian patriarch Athanasius, who opposes the Arian belief to which the emperor subscribes.

=== By place ===
==== Roman Empire ====
- Battle of Mons Seleucus: Emperor Constantius II defeats the usurper Magnentius, who commits suicide in Gaul in order to avoid capture. Constantius becomes sole emperor, and reunifies the Roman Empire.
- Constantius II sends his official Paulus Catena to Britain, to hunt down the opponents supporting Magnentius. Flavius Martinus, vicarius of Britain and supporter of Constantius, opposes the persecutions; he is then accused by Catena of being a traitor. In response, Martinus tries to kill Catena with a sword; he fails and then commits suicide.
- Constantius II assembles a conciliabulum at Arles, and condemns Athanasius as Patriarch of Alexandria.

=== By topic ===
==== China ====
- Wang Xizhi, Chinese calligrapher, produces "Preface to the Poems Composed at the Orchid Pavilion" in running script style. It becomes a model for future calligraphers.

=== By place ===
==== Roman Empire ====
- Emperor Constantius II recalls his Caesar (and cousin) Constantius Gallus to Constantinople after hearing unfavorable reports about him. Gallus, Caesar of the East, has suppressed revolts in Syria Palaestina and central Anatolia. Constantius strips him of his powers and later has him executed in Pola (Croatia).
- The Roman Calendar of 354, an illuminated manuscript, is drawn up and becomes the earliest dated codex.

==== Europe ====
- As a result of the armies of the West having been largely withdrawn by the usurper Magnus Magnentius, to fight Constantius II, hordes of barbarians (Franks and Alemanni) cross the upper Rhine into Gaul and invade the lands of the Helvetians.
- The Bulgars are first mentioned in extant European chronicles.

==== China ====
- Fu Sheng, emperor of the Former Qin, reigns in northern China.

=== By topic ===
==== Religion ====
- Libanius becomes a teacher of rhetoric in Antioch; his students include John Chrysostom and Theodore of Mopsuestia.

=== By place ===
==== Roman Empire ====
- January 1 – Arbitio and Lollianus Mavortius begin their term as Roman consuls.
- August 11 – Claudius Silvanus, accused of treason, proclaims himself Roman Emperor. After 28 days, Ursicinus arrives from Rome and has Silvanus murdered.
- November 6 – In Mediolanum (Italy), Emperor Constantius II raises his cousin Julian the Apostate to the rank of Caesar. He takes command of the western provinces and marries Constantius' sister, Helena.

==== Europe ====
- The Lentienses, a Germanic tribe, are fined by the Roman commander Arbetio under Constantius II for several incursions against the Roman Empire.
- The Franks besiege Colonia Agrippinensium for ten months.

==== Asia ====
- The Huns of Central Asia begin their great drive westwards with an advance into Scythia (modern Ukraine). They overcome and absorb the Alans, a nomadic and warlike horse breeding people from the steppes northeast of the Black Sea.

=== By topic ===
==== Religion ====
- Pope Liberius refuses to sign a condemnation of Athanasius, Patriarch of Alexandria, imposed at Milan by Constantius II. Liberius is exiled to Beroea (Greece) and replaced by Felix II. He becomes an antipope and bishop of Rome.

=== By place ===
==== Roman Empire ====
- February 19 – Emperor Constantius II issues a decree closing all pagan temples in the Roman Empire, and ordering the banishment once again of the anti-Arian patriarch of Alexandria, Athanasius. He tries to have him arrested during a vigil service, but Athanasius flees to the Nitrian desert in Upper Egypt.
- The veneration of non-Christian images is banned in the Roman Empire.
- Siege of Autun: Julian receives a report that Augustodunum (Autun) is under attack by the Alemanni. The city walls are in poor state and in danger of falling.
- Battle of Reims: Julian is defeated by the Alemanni at Reims (Gaul).
- Battle of Brumath: Roman forces pursue Germanic warbands through the Gallic countryside. Julian wins an open battle near Brumath (Alsace).
- Rhaetia (Switzerland) is invaded by the Alemanni.
- Winter – Siege of Senonae: Julian over-winters at Senonae (Bourgogne). German federated troops (foederati) desert and hostile warbands besiege the town.

==== Asia ====
- Naemul becomes king of the Silla dynasty (Three Kingdoms of Korea).

=== By topic ===
==== Religion ====
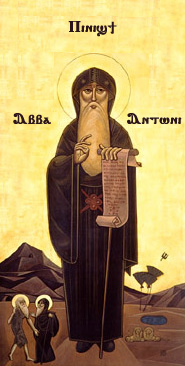
Anthony the Great

- Anthony the Great (pictured) dies at his hermitage near the Red Sea in mid-January at age 105 (approximate), having preached against Arianism, and having tried to codify guidelines for monastic life. His followers subsequently establish the Monastery of Saint Anthony, beginning the tradition of Coptic monasticism.
- Construction begins on the first basilica of Saint Peter in Rome.

=== By place ===
==== Roman Empire ====
- April 28 – Emperor Constantius II enters Rome for the first time to celebrate his victory over Magnentius. He address the Senate and the Roman people.
- Summer – Battle of Strasbourg: Julian, Caesar (deputy emperor) and supreme commander of the Roman army in Gaul, wins an important victory against the Alemanni at Strasbourg (Argentoratum), driving the barbarians back behind the Rhine.
- The Imperial Library of Constantinople is founded.
- Ammianus Marcellinus describes the Pantheon as being "rounded like the boundary of the horizon and vaulted with a beautiful loftiness".
- Winter – Constantius II receives ambassadors from the Persian Empire. They demand that Rome restore the lands surrendered by King Narseh.

==== Asia ====
- The reign of Fú Jiān, the emperor of Former Qin, commences in China.
- The Alans rout the Hun army in Western Asia.

==== Ireland ====
- Saran, King of Ulster, is overthrown.

=== By topic ===
==== Religion ====
- Late in the year Pope Liberius travels to Sirmium (Pannonia) and agrees to sign documents that effectively undo the Nicene Creed (which implicitly disavows Arianism) and to sever his relationship with the former Alexandrian patriarch Athanasius, who is replaced as patriarch of Alexandria by his Arian opponent George of Cappadocia.
- At about this date, the relics of St Andrew the Apostle are taken from Patras to Constantinople by order of the Emperor Constantius II, and deposited in the Church of the Holy Apostles.
- At about this date, Basil of Caesarea visits Egypt.

=== By place ===
==== Roman Empire ====
- Emperor Constantius II builds new forts to secure upper Mesopotamia. Persia's king Shapur II sends an emissary to Constantinople with gifts and a letter wrapped in white silk. He requests that Constantius return the lands of his ancestors from the Euphrates to the frontier of Macedonia. Constantius tactfully refuses to cede any territories.
- The Salian Franks capitulate to Julian the Apostate in Gaul. He allows them to form a Roman foederati in Toxandria. Frankish settlers are established in areas in the north and the east to help with the defense of the Rhine frontier.
- An invasion of Pannonia by the Quadi and the Sarmates is repulsed by Constantius II.
- August 24 — An earthquake destroys Nicomedia, and damages 150 cities in Macedonia, Asia and Pontus.

=== By topic ===
==== Religion ====
- Constantius II recalls Pope Liberius to Rome, where he receives a joyous welcome from the Christians. Antipope Felix II prudently retires to his estate near Porto (Portugal).
- Eudoxius becomes Patriarch of Antioch.
- The last universally binding decision, of the Great Sanhedrin, establishes a fixed Hebrew calendar.

=== By place ===
==== Roman Empire ====
- King Shapur II the Great of the Persian Empire invades southern Armenia. The Romans implement a scorched earth policy and place strong guards at the Euphrates crossings.
- Siege of Amida: Shapur II besieges the Roman fortress of Amida (modern Diyarbakir). After seventy-three days the city is conquered and the population is massacred by the Persians. Ammianus Marcellinus is a fortunate survivor and flees to Singara (Iraq).
- The first known Prefect of the city of Constantinople, Honoratus, takes office.
- Famine in Upper Rhineland: A fleet of 800 river boats, built for the Rhine, cross to the British east coast, and carry back enough corn to raise the famine.
- Winter – Shapur II halts his campaign, due to heavy casualties during the Persian invasion.

=== By topic ===
==== Art ====
- The Sarcophagus of Junius Bassus, in the Old St. Peter's Basilica, Vatican, is made (approximate date).

==== Religion ====
- July – Emperor Constantius II convenes the Council of Rimini, to resolve the crisis over Arianism in the Church. Some 400 bishops of the Western portion of the Roman Empire attend, while the Eastern bishops simultaneously hold a meeting at Seleucia. Given Saint Jerome's comment that, "The whole world groaned in astonishment to find itself Arian", it appears to have failed. Pope Liberius rejects the new creed at Rimini.

== Significant people ==
- Constantius II, Roman Emperor
- Magnentius, Roman usurper
- Julian, Roman Emperor

== Births ==
350

- Honoratus, archbishop of Arles (approximate date);
- Hypatia of Alexandria, female Neoplatonist philosopher (approximate date);
- Murong Wei, emperor of the Xianbei state Former Yan (d. 385);
- Plutarch of Athens, Greek philosopher (approximate date);
- Theodore of Mopsuestia, bishop and theologian (approximate date);
- Zhang Xuanjing, ruler of the Chinese state Former Liang (d. 363).
- Earliest common ancestor of Y haplotype R-S6881 born in north-west Germania (approximate date)

351

- Princess Dowager Helan, mother of Wei Daowudi (d. 396)
- Li Gao, Chinese general of the state Western Liang (d. 417)

352

- Arsenius the Great, anchorite and Desert Father (approximate date)

353

- Saint Vigilius, Bishop of Trent (d. 405)

354

- November 13 – Augustine of Hippo, North African bishop (d. 430)
- Apa Bane, Christian hermit and saint (approximate date)
- Paulinus of Nola, French bishop and writer (d. 431)
- Pelagius, English monk and theologian (d. 418)

355

- Fan Tai, Chinese general of the Jin Dynasty (d. 428)
- Murong Bao, Chinese emperor of Later Yan (d. 398)

356

- 31 March – Aelia Flaccilla, Roman empress and wife of Theodosius I (d. 386)
- John II, Byzantine bishop, theologian and writer (d. 417)

358

- Aignan of Orleans, Christian bishop (d. 453)

359

- Godigisel, king of the Vandals (d. 406)
- Gratian, Roman emperor (d. 383)
- Murong Chong, Chinese emperor (d. 386)
- Stilicho, Roman general (d. 408)

== Deaths ==
350

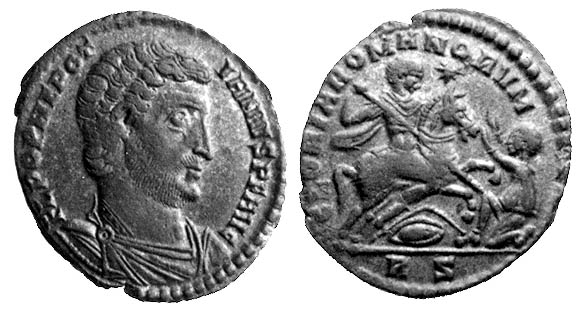
Nepotianus died on June 30, 350

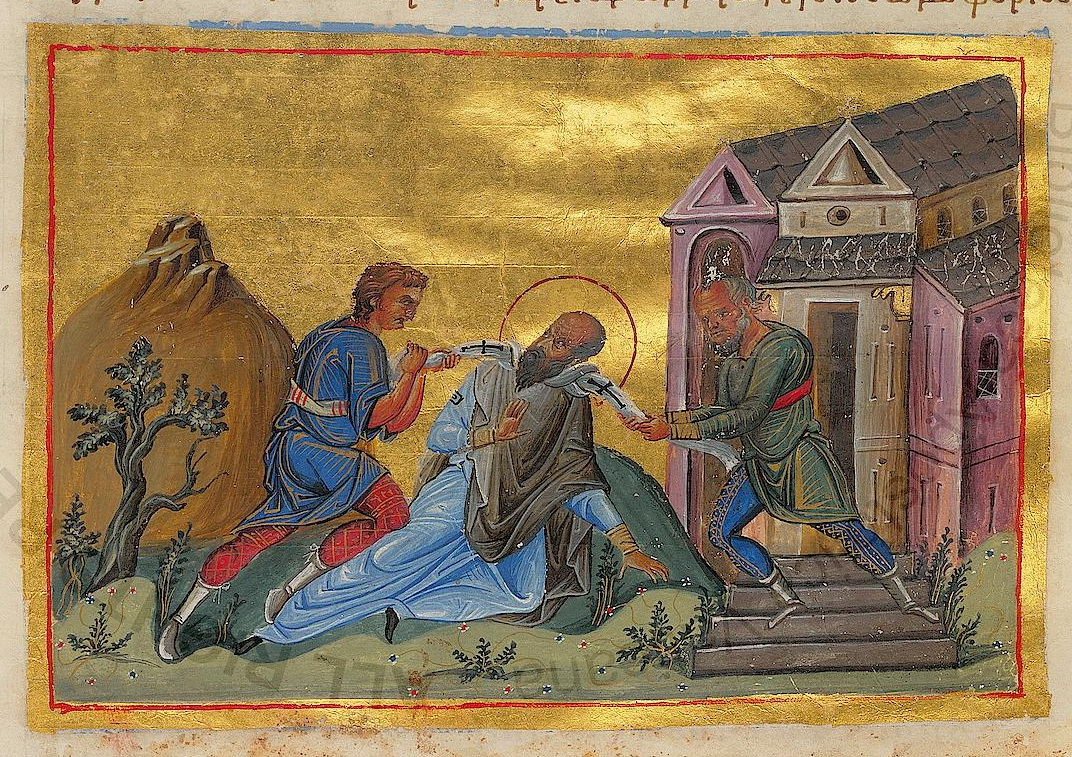
Saint Paul I of Constantinople

- February 11 – Constans I, Roman Emperor;
- June 21 – Martin of Tongres, Roman Catholic bishop and saint;
- June 30 – Nepotianus, Roman usurper;
- August 5 – Cassian of Autun Roman Catholic bishop and saint;
- November 26 – Paul I of Constantinople, Byzantine Orthodox bishop and saint.

=== Date unknown ===
- Shi Jian, emperor of the Jie state Later Zhao.

351

- September 28 – Flavius Romulus, Roman consul
- Marcellinus, Roman general (magister officiorum)
- Shi Zhi, Chinese prince and emperor of Later Zhao

352

- April 12 – Julius I, bishop of Rome
- June 1 – Ran Min, Chinese emperor "Heavenly King" (Tian Wang)
- Yao Yizhong, Chinese general and warlord (b. 280)

353

- August 11 – Magnentius, Roman usurper (b. 303)
- August 18 – Magnus Decentius, brother and Caesar of Magnentius
- Flavius Martinus, vicarius of Roman Britain
- Zhang Chonghua, ruler of Former Liang (b. 327)

354

- Constantina, daughter of Constantine the Great (b. c. 320)
- Constantius Gallus, Roman consul and statesman (b. 326)
- Fu Xiong (or Yuancai), Chinese general and politician
- Pei, Chinese princess and wife of Zhang Chonghua
- Ran Zhi, Chinese nobleman and prince of Ran Wei
- Xie Ai, Chinese general of Former Liang (b. 301)

355

- September 7 – Claudius Silvanus, Roman usurper
- Aedesius, Roman Neoplatonist philosopher and mystic
- Fu Jian, Chinese emperor of the Former Qin (b. 317)
- Liang, Chinese empress of the Former Qin Dynasty
- Zhang Yaoling, Chinese ruler of Former Liang (b. 344)
- Zhang Zuo (or Taibo), Chinese ruler of Former Liang

356

- Amasius of Teano, bishop Teano (also known as St. Paris)
- Anthony the Great, Egyptian monk and Desert Father
- Cai Mo (or Daoming), Chinese official and politician (b. 281)
- Qiang (or Mingde), Chinese empress and wife of Fú Jiàn
- Rav Nachman bar Yitzchak, Babylonian scholar and rabbi
- Sanctinus of Meaux, French bishop and missionary (b. 270)
- Vetranio, Roman statesman, usurper and co-emperor
- Yin Hao (or Yuanyuan), Chinese general and politician

357

- Fu Sheng, Chinese emperor of the Di state Former Qin (b. 335)
- Xie Shang (or Renzu), Chinese general and musician (b. 308)
- Yao Xiang (or Jingguo), Chinese general and warlord (b. 331)

358

- Duan, Chinese princess and wife of Murong Chui
- Paulinus of Trier, Christian bishop and saint

359

- Barbatio, Roman general (magister militum)
- Hosius of Corduba, Christian bishop (b. 256)
- Junius Bassus Theotecnius, Roman politician
- Xun Xian (or Lingze), Chinese general (b. 322)
- Zhang Guan, Chinese general and regent
