= 354 =

354 in various calendars
Gregorian calendar	354; CCCLIV
Ab urbe condita	1107
Assyrian calendar	5104
Balinese saka calendar	275–276
Bengali calendar	−240 – −239
Berber calendar	1304
Buddhist calendar	898
Burmese calendar	−284
Byzantine calendar	5862–5863
Chinese calendar	癸丑年 (Water Ox); 3051 or 2844 — to — 甲寅年 (Wood Tiger); 3052 or 2845
Coptic calendar	70–71
Discordian calendar	1520
Ethiopian calendar	346–347
Hebrew calendar	4114–4115
- Hindu calendars
Vikram Samvat	410–411
Shaka Samvat	275–276
Kali Yuga	3454–3455
Holocene calendar	10354
Iranian calendar	268 BP – 267 BP
Islamic calendar	276 BH – 275 BH
Javanese calendar	236–237
Julian calendar	354; CCCLIV
Korean calendar	2687
Minguo calendar	1558 before ROC 民前1558年
Nanakshahi calendar	−1114
Seleucid era	665/666 AG
Thai solar calendar	896–897
Tibetan calendar	阴水牛年 (female Water-Ox); 480 or 99 or −673 — to — 阳木虎年 (male Wood-Tiger); 481 or 100 or −672

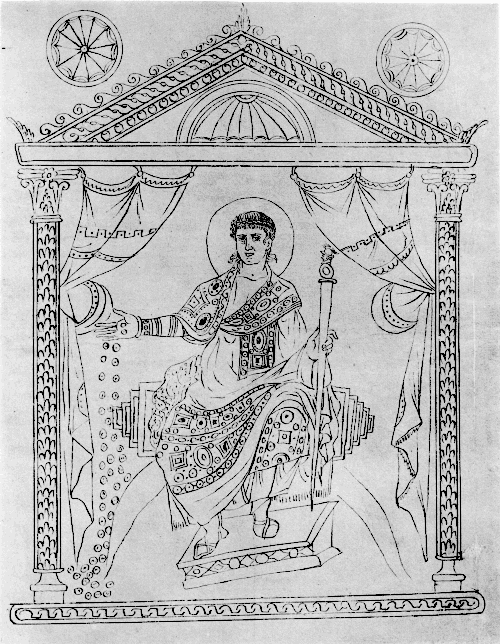
Emperor Constantius II (317–361)

Year 354 (CCCLIV) was a common year starting on Saturday of the Julian calendar. At the time, it was known as the Year of the Consulship of Constantius and Constantius (or, less frequently, year 1107 Ab urbe condita). The denomination 354 for this year has been used since the early medieval period, when the Anno Domini calendar era became the prevalent method in Europe for naming years.

== Events ==
=== By place ===
==== Roman Empire ====
- Emperor Constantius II recalls his Caesar (and cousin) Constantius Gallus to Constantinople after hearing unfavorable reports about him. Gallus, Caesar of the East, has suppressed revolts in Syria Palaestina and central Anatolia. Constantius strips him of his powers and later has him executed in Pola (Croatia).
- The Roman Calendar of 354, an illuminated manuscript, is drawn up and becomes the earliest dated codex.

==== Europe ====
- As a result of the armies of the West having been largely withdrawn by the usurper Magnus Magnentius, to fight Constantius II, hordes of barbarians (Franks and Alemanni) cross the upper Rhine into Gaul and invade the lands of the Helvetians.
- The Bulgars are first mentioned in extant European chronicles.

==== China ====
- Fu Sheng, emperor of the Former Qin, reigns in northern China.

=== By topic ===
==== Religion ====
- Libanius becomes a teacher of rhetoric in Antioch; his students include John Chrysostom and Theodore of Mopsuestia.

== Births ==
- November 13 – Augustine of Hippo, North African bishop (d. 430)
- Apa Bane, Christian hermit and saint (approximate date)
- Paulinus of Nola, French bishop and writer (d. 431)
- Pelagius, English monk and theologian (d. 418)

== Deaths ==
- Constantina, daughter of Constantine the Great (b. c. 320)
- Constantius Gallus, Roman consul and statesman (b. 326)
- Fu Xiong (or Yuancai), Chinese general and politician
- Pei, Chinese princess and wife of Zhang Chonghua
- Ran Zhi, Chinese nobleman and prince of Ran Wei
- Xie Ai, Chinese general of Former Liang (b. 301)
