= 353 =

353 in various calendars
Gregorian calendar	353; CCCLIII
Ab urbe condita	1106
Assyrian calendar	5103
Balinese saka calendar	274–275
Bengali calendar	−241 – −240
Berber calendar	1303
Buddhist calendar	897
Burmese calendar	−285
Byzantine calendar	5861–5862
Chinese calendar	壬子年 (Water Rat); 3050 or 2843 — to — 癸丑年 (Water Ox); 3051 or 2844
Coptic calendar	69–70
Discordian calendar	1519
Ethiopian calendar	345–346
Hebrew calendar	4113–4114
- Hindu calendars
Vikram Samvat	409–410
Shaka Samvat	274–275
Kali Yuga	3453–3454
Holocene calendar	10353
Iranian calendar	269 BP – 268 BP
Islamic calendar	277 BH – 276 BH
Javanese calendar	235–236
Julian calendar	353; CCCLIII
Korean calendar	2686
Minguo calendar	1559 before ROC 民前1559年
Nanakshahi calendar	−1115
Seleucid era	664/665 AG
Thai solar calendar	895–896
Tibetan calendar	阳水鼠年 (male Water-Rat); 479 or 98 or −674 — to — 阴水牛年 (female Water-Ox); 480 or 99 or −673

Year 353 (CCCLIII) was a common year starting on Friday of the Julian calendar. At the time, it was known as the Year of the Consulship of Magnentius and Decentius (or, less frequently, year 1106 Ab urbe condita). The denomination 353 for this year has been used since the early medieval period, when the Anno Domini calendar era became the prevalent method in Europe for naming years.

== Events ==
=== By place ===
==== Roman Empire ====
- Battle of Mons Seleucus: Emperor Constantius II defeats the usurper Magnentius, who commits suicide in Gaul in order to avoid capture. Constantius becomes sole emperor, and reunifies the Roman Empire.
- Constantius II sends his official Paulus Catena to Britain, to hunt down the opponents supporting Magnentius. Flavius Martinus, vicarius of Britain and supporter of Constantius, opposes the persecutions; he is then accused by Catena of being a traitor. In response, Martinus tries to kill Catena with a sword; he fails and then commits suicide.
- Constantius II assembles a conciliabulum at Arles, and condemns Athanasius as Patriarch of Alexandria.

=== By topic ===
==== China ====
- Wang Xizhi, Chinese calligrapher, produces "Preface to the Poems Composed at the Orchid Pavilion" in running script style. It becomes a model for future calligraphers.

== Births ==
- Saint Vigilius, Bishop of Trent (d. 405)

== Deaths ==
- August 11 – Magnentius, Roman usurper (b. 303)
- August 18 – Magnus Decentius, brother and Caesar of Magnentius
- Flavius Martinus, vicarius of Roman Britain
- Zhang Chonghua, ruler of Former Liang (b. 327)
