= Wang Zhuo (Sixteen Kingdoms) =

Sixteen Kingdoms general and warlord

- 王擢
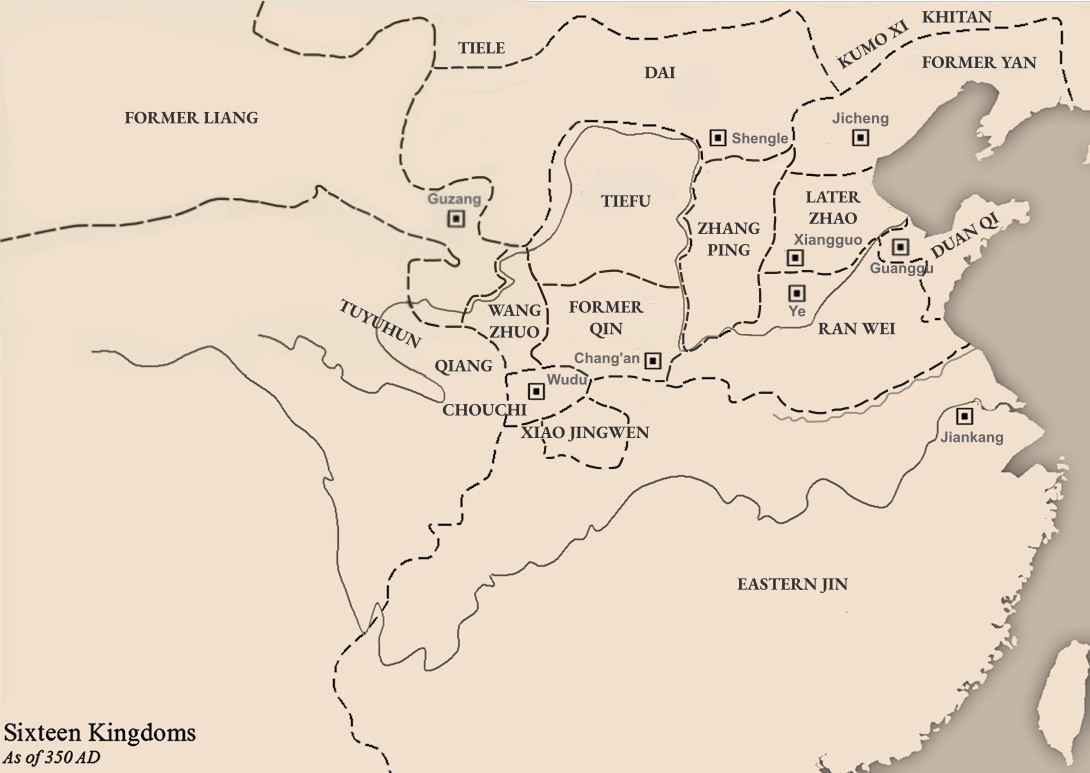
- Wang Zhuo's territory as of 350 AD

General Who Guards Distant Land
- In office 330–?
- Monarch: Shi Le/Shi Hu

General Who Conquers the West
- In office 352–?
- Monarch: Emperor Mu of Jin

Inspector of Yi province
- In office 352–?
- Monarch: Murong Jun

General Who Conquers the Caitiffs
- In office 352–?
- Monarch: Zhang Chonghua

Master of Writing
- In office 354–?
- Monarch: Fu Jiàn

Personal details
- Born: Unknown Longxi County, Gansu
- Died: c. 355 Xi'an, Shaanxi
- Relations: Wang Qiang (brother)
- Children: Wang Tong; Wang Guang; Wang Ling
- Posthumous name: Zhuang (莊)

Wang Zhuo (died c. 355) was a Xiutu military general and warlord during the Jin dynasty (266–420) and Sixteen Kingdoms period. He was an influential commander the Longxi region who served under five dynasties; Later Zhao, Eastern Jin, Former Yan, Former Liang and Former Qin.

== Life ==
=== Wang Qiang's rebellion ===
Wang Zhuo was a member of a Xiutu tribe in Longxi Commandery. His brother, Wang Qiang led their people and initially submitted to the Later Zhao dynasty but rebelled in 330. The Inspector of Qin province, Lin Shen sent his general Guan Guang to suppress the rebellion but was repelled, and Wang Qiang's success encouraged the Di and Qiang tribes of Longxi to also rebel. The Zhao ruler, Shi Le, sent his prince Shi Sheng to handle the situation. Wang Zhuo had been on bad terms with his brother, so when Shi Sheng bribed him to switch sides, he willing accepted the offer. The two men attacked Wang Qiang from both sides, forcing him to flee to Liang province. Wang Zhuo then surrendered to the Zhao and was appointed General Who Guards Distant Lands, maintaining his influence in Longxi.

=== Service under the Later Zhao ===
In 339, Wang Zhuo submitted a petition to the Zhao court, requesting for the 17 families of Qin and Yong provinces that had moved to guard the frontiers to be given preferential treatment, particularly military exemption and permission to return their hometowns.

In 344, Wang Zhuo fought with the Former Liang general, Zhang Guan at Sanjiaocheng (northeast of present-day Hanzhong, Shaanxi) but was defeated. In 346, he joined his fellow generals, Ma Qiu and Sun Fudu to invade the Former Liang. While Ma Qiu and Sun Fudu took Jincheng (in modern Yuzhong County, Gansu), he attacked Wujie (in modern Dingxi, Gansu) and captured the generals Cao Quan and Hu Xuan, forcibly relocating more than 7,000 people to Yong province. Despite this, Liang forces under Xie Ai soon routed the Zhao and forced them to temporarily retreat.

In 347, Wang Zhuo invaded Liang again, this time with Ma Qiu, Shi Ning, Liu Ning and others. Together with Liu Ning, he captured Jinxing (in present-day Jishishan Bonan, Dongxiang and Salar Autonomous County, Gansu), Guangwu (around present-day Yongdeng County, Gansu) and Wujie commanderies before crossing the Hongchi Mountains to Quliu (in present-day Wuwei, Gansu). The Liang ruler, Zhang Chonghua ordered Niu Xuan to intercept them, but he refused to engage in battle by retreating to Fuhan (in modern Linxia, Gansu). Chonghua then sent Xie Ai and others to defend against the enemy. When Xie Ai's army was at Shenyao (modern location unknown), Wang Zhuo attacked his vanguard but was defeated, causing him to retreat south of the Yellow River. Eventually, Xie Ai also defeated Ma Qiu, and the Zhao forces all withdrew to Jincheng.

In 349, after the Prince of Pengcheng, Shi Zun usurped the Zhao throne, the Prince of Pei, Shi Chong raised an army to kill him. In response, Shi Zun sent Wang Zhuo to mediate with Shi Zun, but talks between the two failed to reach an agreement. Shi Chong was soon defeated by Shi Min (later known as Ran Min) and Li Nong before committing suicide. Not long after, Wang Zhuo was appointed the General of the Western Household.

=== Warlord in Longxi ===
For the next two years, the Later Zhao continued to disintegrate before finally being destroyed in 351. During this time, Wang Zhuo held on to the Longxi region. In 352, he sent an envoy to the Eastern Jin dynasty in the south offering his surrender, and was appointed General Who Conquers the West and Inspector of Qin province. Soon, he also sent another envoy to the Former Yan in the east for the same purpose, and he was appointed the Inspector of Yi province. However, in November or December that year, the Prime Minister of the Former Qin dynasty, Fu Xiong invaded Longxi and defeated Wang Zhuo. He fled to the Former Liang, where Zhang Chonghua treated him exceptionally and appointed him the General Who Conquers The Caitiffs and Inspector of Qin.

In 353, Wang Zhuo joined the Liang generals, Zhang Hong and Song Xiu to attack Former Qin with 15,000 infantry and cavalry. They fought Fu Xiong and Fu Jing at Longli (in present-day Wushan County, Gansu), where they suffered a disastrous defeat. 12,000 of their soldier were lost, and both Zhang Hong and Song Xiu were captured and sent to the Qin capital, Chang'an while Wang Zhuo fled alone on horseback. In May or June that year, he led 20,000 soldier to invade Shanggui. Many of the people in Qin province joined forces with Wang Zhuo, who routed Fu Yuan and forced him to retreat to Chang'an.

In 354, when the Grand Marshal of Eastern Jin, Huan Wen led his first northern expedition against Former Qin, Wang Zhuo responded by attacking Chencang in support of him. Wang Zhuo captured Chencang and killed the Interior Minister of Fufeng, Mao Nan. However, a month later, as Huan Wen began to retreat, Qin forces led by Fu Xiong attacked Wang Zhuo, defeating him and prompting him to flee to Lüeyang commandery.

During the campaign, Wang Zhuo had sent a courier to the Liang ruler, Zhang Zuo informing him of Huan Wen's military skills and his unpredictable potential. Zhang Zuo became worried that Huan Wen had plans to invade Liang, and also suspected that Wang Zhuo would cooperate with him and rebel. He plotted with his official, Ma Ji to have Wang Zhuo secretly assassinated, but Wang Zhuo discovered their plans and killed Ma Ji, thus sending him into rebellion. In October or November 354, Zhang Zuo ordered his generals, Niu Ba and Zhang Fang to vanquish Wang Zhuo. Wang Zhuo was defeated and fled to the Former Qin, where he was appointed as a Master of Writing.

Wang Zhuo's final fate is not stated in records. However, according to the epitaph of his descendant, Wang Zhenbao, a Northern Wei official, he was granted land in Nan'an Commandery (南安郡; southeast of present-day Longxi County, Gansu) but died of illness at Chang'an not long after his surrender during the reign of the first Emperor of Qin, Fu Jian, who died in summer 355. He was given the posthumous name of "Zhuang" (莊). Records indicate that he had two sons, Wang Tong and Wang Guang, while Wang Zhenbao's epitaph states he had another son named Wang Ling (王陵), all of who became prominent officials under the Former Qin.
