= Princess Dowager Liu =

Chinese princess

Princess Dowager Liu (劉太妃/劉太后, personal name unknown) was a princess dowager of the Chinese state Former Liang. She was a concubine of Zhang Jun (Duke Zhongcheng) and the mother of his youngest son, Zhang Tianxi (Duke Dao).

Lady Liu gave birth to Zhang Tianxi in 346. That year, Zhang Jun died. Nothing is known about her life between that year and 363, when Zhang Tianxi seized the throne from his nephew Zhang Xuanjing (Duke Jingdao) and honored her as princess dowager. (The exact title he honored her with is disputed historically; Zizhi Tongjian gave it as Taifei (太妃, translate as princess dowager), while Spring and Autumn Annals of the Sixteen Kingdoms gave it as Taihou (太后, translate as queen dowager or empress dowager).

No other mention was made of her until an arguable one in 376, when Zhang Tianxi, under attack from Former Qin, received a rebuke from, according to historical accounts, "his mother Lady Yan." This appears to be an erroneous record, and it was likely Princess Dowager Liu that was referred to, because the records of 363 was unambiguous that Princess Dowager Liu was Zhang Tianxi's mother. The reason why she was referred to as Lady Yan might have been the result of a confusion with Zhang Jun's wife Princess Yan, who had probably died long ago by that point.
