= Minority reign =

Period of a minor serving as a monarch

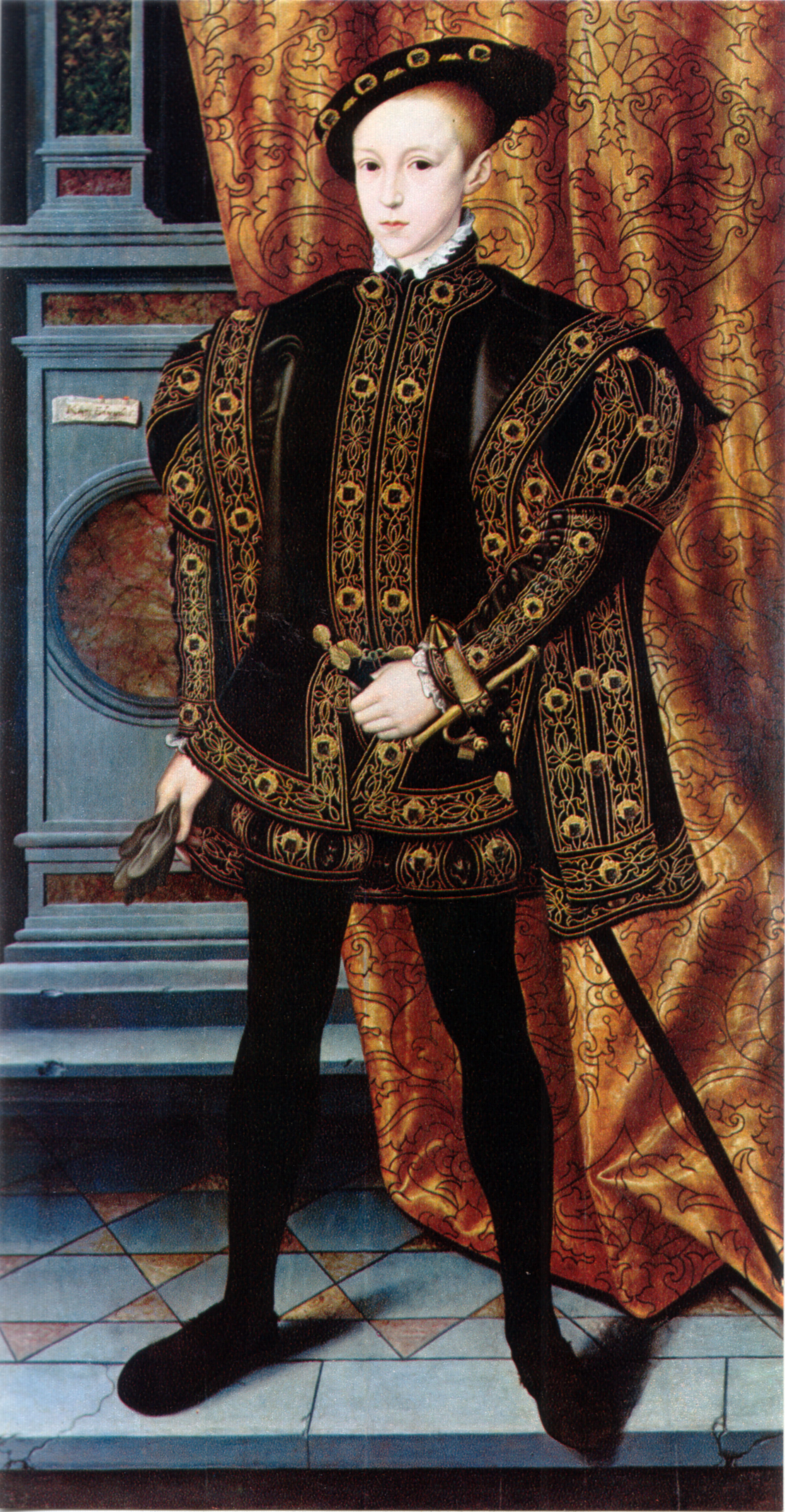
Edward VI of England, who was crowned at age 9

The terms minority reign and royal minority refer to the period of a sovereign's rule when he or she is legally a minor. Minority reigns are of their nature times when politicians and advisors can be especially competitive. Some scholars claim that, in Britain, primogeniture, the growth of conciliar government, and the emergence of the Parliament as a representative and administrative force all occurred within the context of the minority reigns.

Minority reigns also characterized a period in the Roman Empire from 367 to 455, the years that preceded the reign of Valentinian III, who also became emperor at the age of six. The succession of child-turned-adult emperors led to the so-called infantilization of the imperial office, which had taken hold during the long reign of Honorius, Valentinian's predecessor. Here, the imperial office operated within a severely curtailed system compared to its authority a century prior.

== Authority ==
Commonly, a regent is appointed if a sovereign is a minor. There are cases when no regent is appointed, but these did not mean that the monarch held authority. For example, during the minority reign of Theodosius II, power was wielded by Anthemius before his sister Pulcheria was appointed the regent. In many instances, the advent of a royal minority led to fierce competition for any regency office, and in England only one actual regent was ever appointed: In October 1216 William Marshal, 1st Earl of Pembroke became regent for the nine-year-old Henry III on the death of King John. Subsequent royal minorities before 1811 were dealt with by the appointment of officers who held the less provocative title "Lords Justices of the Realm", "Lord Protector" or "Protector and Defender" (after 1422), and sometimes "Guardian of the Realm". In all instances they were intended to be assisted by a collective council or body of officials, although the brief Protectorate of Richard, duke of Gloucester from April to June 1483 did not allow for the naming of an official council.

== Examples ==
Sovereigns who have ruled as minors include:

- Valentinian III, Western Roman Emperor
- Louis the Child of East Francia
- Otto III, Holy Roman Emperor
- Henry IV of Germany
- Frederick II of the Holy Roman Empire
- Pedro II of Brazil
- Simeon II of Bulgaria
- Philip I of France
- Louis IX of France
- John I of France
- Charles VI of France
- Charles VIII of France
- Francis II of France
- Charles IX of France
- Louis XIII of France
- Louis XIV of France
- Louis XV of France
- Henry III of England
- Edward III of England
- Richard II of England
- Henry VI of England
- Edward V of England
- Edward VI of England
- Ladislaus III of Hungary
- Mary of Hungary
- Anne of Brittany
- Wilhelmina of the Netherlands
- Jadwiga of Poland
- Władysław III of Poland
- Sancho II of Portugal
- Afonso V of Portugal
- Sebastian of Portugal
- Afonso VI of Portugal
- Maria II of Portugal
- Pedro V of Portugal
- Michael of Romania
- Ivan IV of Russia
- Peter I the Great of Russia
- Malcolm IV of Scotland
- Alexander III of Scotland
- David II of Scotland
- James I of Scotland
- James II of Scotland
- James III of Scotland
- James IV of Scotland
- James V of Scotland
- Mary, Queen of Scots
- James VI of Scotland
- Alfonso V of León
- Bermudo III of León
- Alfonso VIII of Castile
- Henry I of Castile
- Ferdinand IV of Castile
- Alfonso XI of Castile
- Henry III of Castile
- John II of Castile
- García Sánchez I of Pamplona
- Theobald II of Navarre
- Joan I of Navarre
- Francis Phoebus of Navarre
- Catherine of Navarre
- Petronilla of Aragon
- Alfonso II of Aragon
- James I of Aragon
- Charles II of Spain
- Isabella II of Spain
- Alfonso XIII of Spain
- Peter II of Yugoslavia
- Liu Hong of Western Han (China)
- Emperor Zhao of Western Han (China)
- Emperor Ping of Western Han (China)
- Emperor He of Eastern Han (China)
- Emperor Shang of Eastern Han (China)
- Emperor An of Eastern Han (China)
- Emperor Shun of Eastern Han (China)
- Emperor Chong of Eastern Han (China)
- Emperor Zhi of Eastern Han (China)
- Emperor Huan of Eastern Han (China)
- Emperor Ling of Eastern Han (China)
- Liu Bian of Eastern Han (China)
- Emperor Xian of Eastern Han (China)
- Cao Fang of Cao Wei (China)
- Cao Mao of Cao Wei (China)
- Emperor Yuan of Cao Wei (China)
- Sun Liang of Eastern Wu (China)
- Emperor Min of Western Jin (China)
- Emperor Cheng of Eastern Jin (China)
- Emperor Mu of Eastern Jin (China)
- Emperor Xiaowu of Eastern Jin (China)
- Emperor An of Eastern Jin (China)
- Duke Ai of Former Liang (China)
- Prince Chong of Former Liang (China)
- Shi Shi of Later Zhao (China)
- Emperor You of Former Yan (China)
- Emperor Wencheng of Northern Wei (China)
- Emperor Xianwen of Northern Wei (China)
- Emperor Xiaowen of Northern Wei (China)
- Emperor Xiaoming of Northern Wei (China)
- Yuan Zhao of Northern Wei (China)
- Emperor Xiaojing of Eastern Wei (China)
- Gao Yin of Northern Qi (China)
- Gao Wei of Northern Qi (China)
- Gao Heng of Northern Qi (China)
- Emperor Jing of Northern Zhou (China)
- Liu Yu of Liu Song (China)
- Emperor Shun of Liu Song (China)
- Xiao Zhaowen of Southern Qi (China)
- Emperor He of Southern Qi (China)
- Emperor Jing of Liang (China)
- Chen Bozong of Chen (China)
- Yang You of Sui (China)
- Yang Tong of Sui (China)
- Emperor Shang of Tang (China)
- Emperor Jingzong of Tang (China)
- Emperor Xizong of Tang (China)
- Emperor Ai of Tang (China)
- Emperor Gong of Later Zhou (China)
- Emperor Xuan of Yang Wu (China)
- King Chengzong of Wuyue (China)
- Emperor Shengzong of Liao (China)
- Emperor Renzong of Northern Song (China)
- Emperor Zhezong of Northern Song (China)
- Emperor Gong of Southern Song (China)
- Emperor Duanzong of Southern Song (China)
- Zhao Bing of Southern Song (China)
- Emperor Yizong of Western Xia (China)
- Emperor Huizong of Western Xia (China)
- Emperor Chongzong of Western Xia (China)
- Tianshun Emperor of Yuan (China)
- Emperor Ningzong of Yuan (China)
- Emperor Yingzong of Ming (China)
- Zhengde Emperor of Ming (China)
- Jiajing Emperor of Ming (China)
- Wanli Emperor of Ming (China)
- Tianqi Emperor of Ming (China)
- Shunzhi Emperor of Qing (China)
- Kangxi Emperor of Qing (China)
- Tongzhi Emperor of Qing (China)
- Guangxu Emperor of Qing (China)
- Xuantong Emperor of Qing (China)
