= Consort Xin (Zhang Zuo's wife) =

Empress Xin (Chinese: 辛皇后) or Princess Xin (Chinese: 辛王后; personal name unknown) was a consort of Zhang Zuo (Prince Wei) of the Chinese Former Liang dynasty.

Whether her title was empress or princess is unclear, because historical sources differ on the subject. The Book of Jin, which reported that her husband claimed the title of emperor when he declared a total break from Eastern Jin dynasty in 354, reported that he created her empress. Zizhi Tongjian, which reported that her husband claimed the title of prince, reported that he created her princess. Nothing else is known about her. In 355, when her husband was killed in a coup and replaced by his nephew Zhang Xuanjing, his two sons (whether by her or not) were also executed, but nothing was mentioned about her fate.

Chinese royalty
Preceded by Princess Pei	Princess of Former Liang; 354–355	Dynasty destroyed ^{1}
Preceded by Princess Pei	Empress of China (Gansu); 354–355	Succeeded by Empress Gou of Former Qin
