= Princess Dowager Guo =

Chinese princess in Former Liang

Empress (also known as Princess) Dowager Guo (郭太妃, personal name unknown) was an empress/princess dowager of the Chinese state Former Liang. She was Zhang Chonghua (Prince Jinglie)'s concubine and likely the mother of Zhang Xuanjing (Duke Jingdao).

Prior to 363, Zhang Xuanjing's grandmother Princess Dowager Ma had been princess dowager, but after she died that year, Zhang Xuanjing honored Lady Guo as princess dowager. (She was only described as Zhang Chonghua's concubine and not as Zhang Xuanjing's mother, but there would be little reason for him to honor her as princess dowager if she were not his mother.) Because Zhang Xuanjing's uncle, the regent Zhang Tianxi, was acting dictatorially, she conspired with officials led by Zhang Qin (張欽) to kill Zhang Tianxi, but the news leaked, and Zhang Tianxi had Zhang Qin put to death. (This implies that Princess Dowager Guo was not put to death.) Zhang Xuanjing, in fear, offered to yield the throne to Zhang Tianxi, but Zhang Tianxi refused. However, a month later, he sent soldiers into the palace and assassinated the 13-year-old duke. He himself took the Jin-created title the Duke of Xiping, which his nephew had held. Princess Dowager Guo's fate was not mentioned.
