= Xie Ai =

- 謝艾

Administrator of Jiuquan (酒泉太守)
- In office ? – 353
- Monarch: Zhang Chonghua

Personal details
- Born: Unknown Dunhuang, Gansu
- Died: 353
- Peerage: Earl of Fulu (福祿伯)

Xie Ai (simplified Chinese: 谢艾; traditional Chinese: 謝艾; pinyin: Xiè ài, died 353) was a general for the Chinese state Former Liang who served under Zhang Chonghua.

== Military career ==
Xie Ai was initially regarded as only capable in civilian matters, and apparently served as a civilian official during the rule of Zhang Chonghua's father Zhang Jun. In 346, in light of Zhang Jun's death and succession by Zhang Chonghua, Later Zhao launched a major attack against Former Liang, with intent to destroy Former Liang. Under the recommendation of the general Zhang Chen (張耽), who knew of Xie's capabilities in military strategy, Zhang Chonghua made Xie a general and had him face the Later Zhao forces commanded by Wang Zhuo and Ma Qiu. After an initial victory later in 346, Zhang Chonghua created Xie the Count of Fulu. In 347, as Ma sieged the important city Fuhan (枹罕, in modern Linxia Hui Autonomous Prefecture, Gansu), Zhang Chonghua sent Xie to try to relieve the city. As Xie arrived at the frontline, he was seen wearing a white cap and riding in a wagon—making him appear to be a civilian—and Ma felt insulted that Xie apparently did not consider his siege an emergency. He sent some elite soldiers to make an attack against Xie, but Xie calmly responded, and Ma's elite soldiers thought they were getting into a trap and stopped their advance. Meanwhile, an army sent by Xie had already gone behind them and started an attack. Xie then advanced as well and dealt Ma a great loss. In the fall, Ma attacked Former Liang again and was again repelled by Xie. (However, Xie's victories appeared to be insufficient for Former Liang to regain the territories lost in the initial Later Zhao attack, south of the Yellow River.)

Several years later, due to defamations by Zhang Chonghua's attendants Zhao Zhang (趙長) and Wei Ji (尉緝), Zhang Chonghua sent Xie out of the capital to be the governor of Jiuquan Commandery (酒泉, roughly modern Jiuquan, Gansu). However, when Zhang Chonghua grew gravely ill in 353, he tried to recall Xie to be regent for his son and heir Zhang Yaoling. The order, however, was intercepted by Zhao and Zhang Chonghua's brother Zhang Zuo and not announced. Zhang Chonghua soon died and was succeeded by Zhang Yaoling, but real power was in Zhang Zuo's hands. In early 354, Zhang Zuo, with the support of Zhang Chonghua's mother Princess Dowager Ma (with whom he had an affair), formally took over as ruler, and he, still bearing a grudge against Xie for having earlier warned Zhang Chonghua about his treachery, had Xie put to death.
