= Zhang Tianxi =

Duke of Xiping from 363 to 376

Zhang Tianxi 張天錫
- Duke of Xiping

Ruler of Former Liang
- Reign: 363–376
- Predecessor: Zhang Xuanjing
- Born: 338 or 346
- Died: 406 (aged 59–60); Eastern Jin
Names
- Zhang Tianxi (張天錫)
Era dates
- Shēngpíng (升平) (Note: Used the era name of Emperor Mu of Jin. Due to the distance between Former Liang and Eastern Jin, when he ascended the throne, Zhang likely didn't know that Emperor Mu had already died in 361.): 363–376
Regnal name
- Ordered to hold tally, Grand Commander, Grand General, Colonel to Guard the Qiang people, Governor of Liang Province, Duke of Xiping (使持節 大都督 大將軍 護羌校尉 涼州牧 西平公)
Posthumous name
- Duke Dao (敬悼公, honored by Eastern Jin)
- Dynasty: Former Liang
- Father: Zhang Jun

Zhang Tianxi (Chinese: 張天錫; 346?–406?), (Note: Zhang's biography in Jin Shu recorded that he was 61 (by East Asian reckoning) when he died soon after Huan Xuan's usurpation in 404. However, his biography in Shiliuguo Chunqiu recorded that he was 18 (by East Asian reckoning) when his nephew Xuanjing ascended the throne in 355; the Taiping Yulan, also citing Chunqiu, recorded that Tianxi was 18 (by East Asian reckoning) when he ascended the throne in the 8th year of Xuanjing's reign. The last event recorded in his biography in Chunqiu which can be dated was the Battle of Fei River, and the biography did not record his age when he died.) original courtesy name Gongchungu (公純嘏), later Chungu (純嘏), nickname Duhuo (獨活), formally Duke Dao of Xiping (西平悼公), was the last ruler of the Chinese state Former Liang. He was the youngest son of Zhang Jun (Duke Zhongcheng), and he seized the throne from his nephew Zhang Xuanjing (Duke Jingdao) in 363. During his reign, he claimed vassal status with regards to both Jin Dynasty and Former Qin. Eventually, under Former Qin pressure to completely submit, he tried to resist militarily, but was unsuccessful and surrendered in 376, ending Former Liang. He became a Former Qin official (Note: with the title Marquess of Guiyi (歸義侯)), but after Former Qin's failed attempt to conquer Jin in 383 at the Battle of Fei River, he fled to Jin. Although the Jin imperial government was not happy about some of his actions as the ruler of Former Liang (Note: including his vacillation and his use of a single era name, as opposed to changing the era name with the ascension of a new monarch as was expected from a true vassal), it recognized how his ancestors had long formally held out as a Jin vassal, and Emperor Xiaowu restored him to the title of Duke of Xiping. He died in 406, 30 years after his state was destroyed.

== Early life ==
Zhang Tianxi was born in 346, the same year that his father Zhang Jun died, and it is not known whether he was born before or after his father's death. His mother was probably Zhang Jun's concubine Lady Liu. (Note: See her article on confusion about his mother's identity.)

Not much is known about Zhang Tianxi's early life other than that in 354, when his older brother Zhang Zuo formally broke away from Jin, Zhang Zuo created him the Marquess of Changning. Sometime either during Zhang Zuo's reign or that of his nephew Zhang Xuanjing, who became ruler after the violent and arbitrary Zhang Zuo was overthrown in 355, Zhang Tianxi visited the Jin capital Jiankang, and it was this time that his non-standard, three-character courtesy name Gongchungu was apparently joked about, so he dropped the initial character "Gong" and made it Chungu.

== As Zhang Xuanjing's regent ==
The young Zhang Xuanjing went through a progression of regents. In 361, the capable regent Song Hun died and was replaced by his brother Song Cheng (宋澄), who was then overthrown in a coup later that year by the general Zhang Yong (張邕). Zhang Yong and Zhang Tianxi then served as co-regents.

After becoming regent, Zhang Yong became arrogant, sexually immoral, and dictatorial, and he often executed officials, causing the nobles and the officials to be fearful. Zhang Tianxi's assistants Liu Su (劉肅), comparing Zhang Yong to Zhang Zuo, persuaded him that he needed to act against Zhang Yong, and later in 361, Zhang Tianxi had Liu Su and another assistant, Zhao Baiju (趙白駒) attempt to assassinate Zhang Yong, but failed. Zhang Yong then gathered his troops and attacked Zhang Tianxi, but Zhang Tianxi persuaded Zhang Yong's troops that he was avenging the Song clan and that Zhang Yong's next move was going to be to slaughtered the royal Zhang clan. Zhang's forces, hearing this, abandoned him, and Zhang Yong committed suicide. His clan was slaughtered, and Zhang Tianxi became sole regent. Zhang Tianxi ended the practice of using Emperor Min of Jin's era name Jianxing and instead started using the current era name of Jin Dynasty (Note: at the time, Emperor Mu's Shengping), to show even greater affinity with Jin.

In 363, Princess Dowager Ma, Zhang Xuanjing's grandmother and the mother of Zhang Tianxi's older brother Zhang Chonghua (Duke Jinglie) died, and Zhang Xuanjing honored his mother Lady Guo as princess dowager. She became concerned that Zhang Tianxi was acting dictatorially, and she conspired with the high-level official Zhang Qin (張欽) to kill Zhang Tianxi, but the news leaked, and Zhang Qin and other conspirators were put to death. Zhang Xuanjing became fearful and offered to yield the throne to Zhang Tianxi, but Zhang Tianxi refused. A month later, however, he had Liu Su lead soldiers into the palace to assassinate the 13-year-old Zhang Xuanjing, but claimed that Zhang Xuanjing died of an illness. Zhang Tianxi took the throne himself. He honored his mother Lady Liu as princess dowager, and he immediately sought out an official Jin commission as the Duke of Xiping, and released the Jin messenger Yu Gui (俞歸), who had been detained by Zhang Chonghua in 347 after offending him by refusing to grant him the Prince of Liang title that he wanted.

== Reign ==
Zhang Tianxi's reign was regarded as one that was filled by arbitrariness, as he apparently allowed Liu Su, Zhao Baiju, and other trusted followers, none of whom was older than 20 years at the time of his ascension, govern as they wished. (Note: Zhang himself was 17 when he became duke.) He even formally adopted Liu and Liang Jing (梁景) as his own sons, even though they were around the same age as he. The experienced generals were largely offended at this development; while they did not dare to openly defy him, they did not have a sense of loyalty to him.

In 364, Fu Jiān, the emperor of Former Qin, conferred on Zhang Tianxi the same Jin-conferred titles that he had claimed, and Zhang Tianxi did not refuse, implicitly submitting as a vassal to Former Qin. Late in 366, however, he sent messengers to the borders with Former Qin, declaring an end to the states' relations.

Later that year, Li Yan (李儼), a warlord who had occupied Longxi Commandery (隴西, roughly modern Dingxi, Gansu) and become a Former Qin vassal but who had also maintained contact with Former Liang, formally declared independence and cut off relations with Former Qin and Former Liang, occupying the commanderies around him. In early 367, Zhang Tianxi personally attacked Li and took a number of cities from him. Li became fearful and apologized to Former Qin, seeking assistance. The Former Qin prime minister Wang Meng led a force to try to relieve Li's capital Fuhan (枹罕, in modern Linxia Hui Autonomous Prefecture, Gansu), and Wang and Zhang's forces came to a stalemate at Fuhan. Wang proposed a compromise—that Zhang would be allowed to capture Li's people and bring them back to his domain, while Wang would be allowed to carry Li east. Zhang Tianxi accepted, and a major confrontation with Former Qin was averted.

In 371, after having destroyed Former Yan in 370, Fu Jiān sent messengers Liang Shu (梁殊) and Yan Fu (閻負) to Former Liang, along with the previously captured Former Liang general Yin Ju (陰據) and a letter from Wang Meng, in which Wang tried to intimidate Zhang Tianxi into submission. Impressed with Former Qin's show of force, Zhang Tianxi became fearful and apologized, again submitting himself as a Former Qin vassal. Later that year, however, fearful that Former Qin had based large number of troops at his borders, he built an altar west of the capital Guzang (姑臧, in modern Wuwei, Gansu) and had his subordinates pledge an oath both to himself and to Jin, and then tried to petition the paramount Jin general Huan Wen to jointly attack Former Qin with him. Huan's reaction is unknown, but no campaign was actually carried out.

Under Former Qin threat, however, Zhang Tianxi became more obsessed with drinking and women than before, ignoring the duties of state. He also deposed his first heir apparent, Zhang Dahuai (張大懷) and made the son of his favorite concubine Consort Jiao, Zhang Dayu (張大豫), heir apparent. During one illness, he told two other favorite concubines, Consorts Yuan and Xue, that they should remember how much he favored them. When he fell very ill and appeared to be on the verge of death, they therefore committed suicide. He later recovered and buried them with honor.

In 376, Fu Jiān decided to try to conquer or to intimidate Zhang Tianxi into complete submission. He sent a major force of 130,000 men, commanded by the general Gou Chang (苟萇) to head toward Zhang Tianxi's domain, but ahead of the force sent Yan and Liang again to try to persuade Zhang Tianxi to completely submit and visit the Former Qin capital Chang'an for an official visit. Zhang Tianxi, believing that he would never be released if he went to Chang'an, decided to resist, and he cruelly executed Yan and Liang by ordering his officials to fire arrows at them, declaring, "If you cannot hit them, then you are showing you are not of the same heart as mine." He sent the experienced general Ma Jian (馬建) to resist, but Ma, who had already been unhappy about Zhang Tianxi's rule, surrendered to Former Qin forces. The other armies that Zhang Tianxi sent were all defeated by Former Liang forces, and the last one commanded by Chang Ju (常據) was annihilated. Zhang Tianxi himself tried to lead an army to resist, but uprisings in Guzang started as soon as he tried to leave Guzang. He became fearful and returned to Guzang and then surrendered. Former Liang was at its end.

== After the fall of Former Liang ==
Fu Jiān spared Zhang Tianxi and gave him a mid-level government post, creating him the Marquess of Guiyi. (Note: Before the campaign started, Fu Jiān had also started building a mansion for Zhang in Chang'an, and by the time that Zhang surrendered, the mansion was complete.)

In 383, Zhang was attending to Fu Jiān when Former Qin forces, trying to destroy Jin, was defeated by Jin forces at the Battle of Fei River. Zhang took this opportunity to flee to Jin along with the captured Jin generals Zhu Xu (朱序) and Xu Yuanxi (徐元喜). (Note: His son Zhang Dayu, who was unable to flee with him, later tried to reestablish Former Liang, but was defeated and killed by Later Liang's founder Lü Guang in 387.) Emperor Xiaowu of Jin made him a mid-level official and restored him to the title of Duke of Xiping, remembering his ancestors' loyalty. He became known for his literary skills, but the Jin officials largely disrespected him for losing his state and being captured by Former Qin. At some point, his mental state began to deteriorate (Note: perhaps under Alzheimer's disease or some other illness that afflicted the mind) and was no longer given important posts. By the 390s, when Sima Yuanxian, the cousin of Emperor An, was in power, he often summoned Zhang to make fun of him, but did consider Zhang's poverty and made him a commandery governor. Later, after Huan Xuan overthrew Sima Yuanxian, he wanted to use Zhang's family reputation for military purposes, and he gave Zhang the title of governor of Liang Province (涼州, modern central and western Gansu, Former Liang's domain, but which Jin did not control at the time). Zhang died in 406.

== Era name ==
- Shengping (升平 shēng píng) 363–376

== Personal information ==
- Father
  - Zhang Jun (Duke Zhongcheng)
- Mother
  - Lady Liu (but see article on her on confusion with regard to his mother's identity)
- Wife
  - Unclear whether he had one; historical accounts did not state that he had one but appeared to imply that he did, but no identity was ever given
- Major Concubines
  - Consort Jiao, mother of Heir Apparent Dayu
  - Consort Yuan (committed suicide when he was ill)
  - Consort Xue (committed suicide when he was ill)
- Children
  - Zhang Dahuai (張大懷), initially the heir apparent (created 367), later demoted to Duke of Gaochang
  - Zhang Dayu (張大豫), the second heir apparent, claimed title of Governor of Liang in 386, killed by Lü Guang of Later Liang 387

== Notes ==
Duke Dao of Xiping House of Zhang Born: 346 Died: 406
Chinese nobility
Preceded by Zhang Xuanjing	Duke of Xiping; 363–376	In abeyance Annexed by Former Qin Title next held by Himself
Vacant Last known title holder: Li Shi	Marquess of Guiyi; 376–383	Vacant Title next held by Qifu Gangui
Recreated Restored by Jin Title last held by Himself	Duke of Xiping; 396–406	Extinct
