= 327 =

327 in various calendars
- Gregorian calendar: 327; CCCXXVII
- Ab urbe condita: 1080
- Assyrian calendar: 5077
- Balinese saka calendar: 248–249
- Bengali calendar: −267 – −266
- Berber calendar: 1277
- Buddhist calendar: 871
- Burmese calendar: −311
- Byzantine calendar: 5835–5836
- Chinese calendar: 丙戌年 (Fire Dog); 3024 or 2817 — to — 丁亥年 (Fire Pig); 3025 or 2818
- Coptic calendar: 43–44
- Discordian calendar: 1493
- Ethiopian calendar: 319–320
- Hebrew calendar: 4087–4088
- Hindu calendars
- Vikram Samvat: 383–384
- Shaka Samvat: 248–249
- Kali Yuga: 3427–3428
- Holocene calendar: 10327
- Iranian calendar: 295 BP – 294 BP
- Islamic calendar: 304 BH – 303 BH
- Javanese calendar: 208–209
- Julian calendar: 327; CCCXXVII
- Korean calendar: 2660
- Minguo calendar: 1585 before ROC 民前1585年
- Nanakshahi calendar: −1141
- Seleucid era: 638/639 AG
- Thai solar calendar: 869–870
- Tibetan calendar: མེ་ཕོ་ཁྱི་ལོ་ (male Fire-Dog); 453 or 72 or −700 — to — མེ་མོ་ཕག་ལོ་ (female Fire-Boar); 454 or 73 or −699

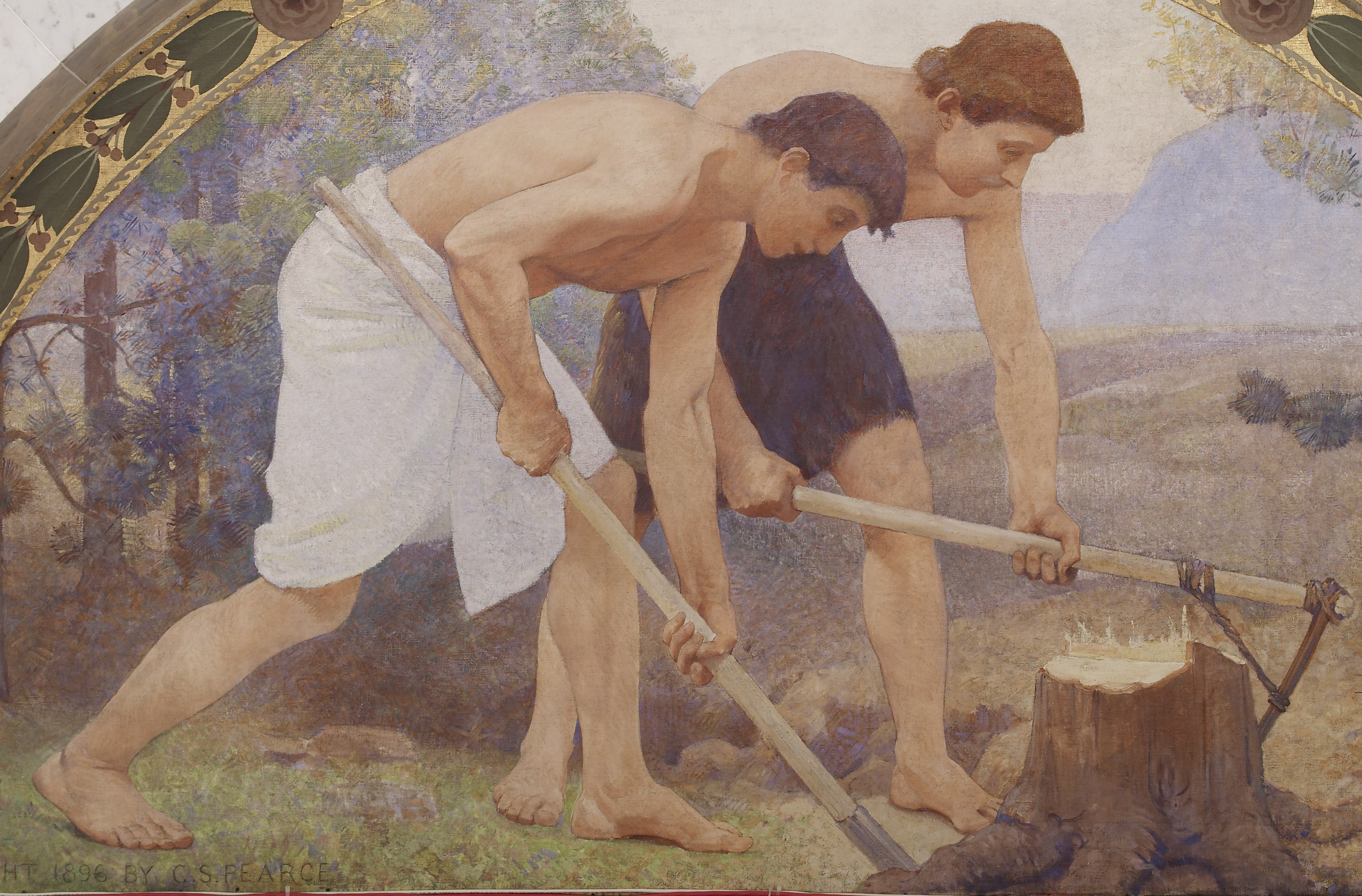
Detail from Labor, by Charles Sprague Pearce (1898)

Year 327 (CCCXXVII) was a common year starting on Sunday of the Julian calendar. At the time, it was known in Rome as the Year of the Consulship of Constantius and Maximus (or, less frequently, year 1080 Ab urbe condita). The denomination 327 for this year has been used since the early medieval period, when the Anno Domini calendar era became the prevalent method in Europe for naming years.

== Events ==
=== By place ===
==== Roman Empire ====
- Emperor Constantine the Great decrees that rural slaves can only be sold in the province where they reside, in order to resolve the shortage of labour in the Roman Empire.

=== By topic ===
==== Religion ====
- Construction begins on the Great Church of Antioch, which will be completed in 341.
- Approximate traditional date – Helena, mother of Constantine, returning from her pilgrimage to the Holy Land, founds Stavrovouni Monastery on Cyprus.

== Births ==
- Urban of Langres, French bishop and saint
- Zhang Chonghua, Chinese ruler of Han-Zhao (d. 353)

== Deaths ==
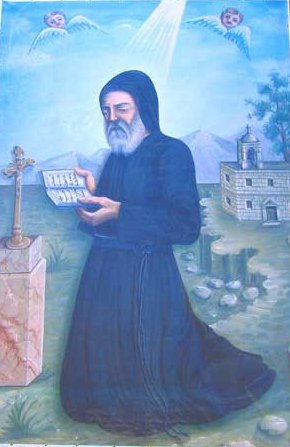
Saint Awtel

- June 3 – Awtel, Eastern Christian monk and saint
- Cleopatra, Christian martyr and saint (or 319)
- Jonas and Barachisius, Persian martyrs
- Melitius of Lycopolis, Christian bishop
