= Zhang Gui =

Zhang Gui 張軌
- Prince of Former Liang (posthumously)

Inspector of Liang Province
- Reign: 301–314
- Successor: Zhang Shi
- Born: 255
- Died: 314 (aged 58–59)
Names
- Zhang Gui (張軌)
Regnal name
- General to Pacify the West, Inspector of Liang Province, Colonel to Guard the Qiang people, Marquis of Anle District (安西將軍 涼州刺史 領護羌校尉 安樂鄉侯)
Posthumous name
- Duke Wu (武公, honored by Western Jin); Prince Wu (武王, honored by Zhang Zuo)
Temple name
- Taizu (太祖, honored by Zhang Zuo)
- Dynasty: Former Liang
- Father: Zhang Wen
- Mother: Lady Xin

Zhang Gui (Chinese: 張軌, 255 – 19 June 314) was the governor of Liang province and first Duke of Xiping under the Western Jin. He was the seventeenth-generation descendant of Zhang Er, the King of Changshan from the Chu–Han Contention era. In c.February 301, he was appointed governor of Liang province. In 313, Emperor Min of Jin bestowed upon Zhang the title "Duke of Xiping"; Zhang declined the title. The following year, Zhang Gui died from an illness and his followers supported his eldest son Zhang Shi to continue as governor of Liang province.

== Life ==
=== Before the War of the Eight Princes ===
When Zhang Gui was young, he was friendly with Huangfu Mi, who was from the same commandery. During the reign of Emperor Wu of Jin, Zhang Gui once served under Yang Yao (younger brother of Yang Jun) who was then General of the Guards.

=== During the War ===
In 303-304, Sima Yong and Sima Ying sieged Luoyang. Zhang Gui sent 3000 troops to assist the then-regent of Emperor Hui, Sima Ai.

Duke Wu of Xiping House of Zhang Born: 255 Died: 314
Chinese nobility
New title	Duke of Xiping; 313–314	Succeeded by Zhang Shi
