= Song Hun =

Regent of Former Liang (died 361)

Song Hun (Chinese: 宋混) (died 361), courtesy name Xuanyi (Chinese: 玄一), was a regent of the Chinese Former Liang dynasty.

During the reign of the violent and capricious Zhang Zuo, Song Hun served as a general, even though he constantly feared Zhang Zuo, because his older brother Song Xiu (宋修) had previously had a conflict with Zhang Zuo. In 355, when Zhang Guan rose against Zhang Zuo, Song started an uprising of his own against Zhang Zuo as well, and quickly arrived at the capital Guzang (姑臧, in modern Wuwei, Gansu). Zhang Guan's brother Zhang Ju (張琚) and son Zhang Song (張嵩) then started an uprising inside the city and opened the gates to welcome Song's forces in. Zhang Zuo's own troops turned on him and killed him. Song and Zhang Ju jointly declared Zhang Zuo's nephew, Zhang Xuanjing (whose older brother Zhang Yaoling was the legitimate ruler before Zhang Zuo seized the throne from him and killed him), the Duke of Xiping, a Jin-created title that his ancestors had carried for generations. When Zhang Guan subsequently arrived, Zhang Guan became regent, and Song was a key assistant. Zhang Guan overruled Song's decision and had Zhang Xuanjing claim a title that Jin had never conferred—Prince of Liang.

Zhang Guan's regency was a dictatorial one, and he suspected people of conspiring against him. He was particularly suspicious of Song, since Song was loyal to the state institutions, and Zhang Guan wanted to eventually take over as ruler himself. In 359, he therefore planned to kill Song Hun and his brother Song Cheng (宋澄). Song Hun heard this and started an uprising, declaring that Zhang Guan had committed treason and that he had authorization from Zhang Xuanjing's grandmother Princess Dowager Ma to kill him. Their forces battled inside the city, but Song Hun's forces prevailed, and Zhang Guan and Zhang Ju committed suicide. He slaughtered their clan.

Song Hun was considered an able and tolerant regent—even, for example, commissioning one of Zhang Guan's bodyguards, Xuan Lu (玄臚), who had, during the battle, tried to kill him with a spear but failed and was captured, as a trusted officer. Under his decision, Zhang Xuanjing relinquished the title Prince of Liang and again claimed the Jin-created title Duke of Xiping. Song himself was created the Marquess of Jiuquan.

In 361, Song Hun grew ill, and Zhang Xuanjing and Princess Dowager Ma visited him personally, asking whether his son Song Linzong (宋林宗) should succeed him if he died. Song Hun noted that Song Linzong was young and weak in personality, and that Song Cheng might be an appropriate choice—but also warned that Song Cheng's reaction was slow and needed to be watched closely. Song Hun warned Song Cheng and his own sons that they needed to be humble and faithful to the state, and he told many officials the same. He soon died, and it was described that the commoners on the street were all mournful and weeping. Song Cheng became regent, but just several months later, the general Zhang Yong (張邕), who was unhappy that Song Cheng became regent, overthrew Song Cheng and slaughtered the Song clan. Zhang Yong and Zhang Xuanjing's uncle Zhang Tianxi served as coregents, and soon Zhang Tianxi killed Zhang Yong (claiming, inter alia, to be avenging the Songs), but eventually overthrew Zhang Xuanjing himself in 363 and took the throne.
