= Zhang Jun (prince) =

Zhang Jun 張駿
- Prince of Former Liang

Ruler of Former Liang
- Reign: 324–346
- Predecessor: Zhang Mao
- Successor: Zhang Chonghua
- Born: 307
- Died: 346 (aged 38–39)
Names
- Zhang Jun (張駿)
Era name and dates
- Jiànxīng (建興) (Note: Used the era name of the Emperor Min of Jin.): 324–346
Regnal name
- 324–333: Given tally, Grand Commander, Grand General, Governor of Liang Province, Colonel to Guard the Qiang people, Duke of Xiping (使持節 大都督 大將軍 涼州牧 領護羌校尉 西平公) 333–345: Grand General to Guard the West, Inspector of Liang Province, Colonel to Guard the Qiang people, Duke of Xiping (鎮西大將軍 涼州刺史 領護羌校尉 西平公) Since 345: Grand Commander, Grand General, Acting Prince of Liang (大都督 大將軍 假涼王)
Posthumous name
- Duke Zhongcheng (忠成公, honored by Eastern Jin); Prince Wen (文王, honored by Zhang Zuo)
Temple name
- Shizu (世祖, honored by Zhang Zuo)
- Dynasty: Former Liang
- Father: Zhang Shi

Zhang Jun

courtesy name Gongting
- Chinese: 公庭
Transcriptions
Standard Mandarin
- Hanyu Pinyin: Gōngtíng
Middle Chinese
- Middle Chinese: /kuŋdeŋ/

Duke Zhongcheng of Xiping
- Chinese: 西平忠成公
Transcriptions
Standard Mandarin
- Hanyu Pinyin: Xīpíng Zhōngchéng Gōng
Middle Chinese
- Middle Chinese: /seibˠiæŋ ʈɨuŋd͡ʑiᴇŋ kuŋ/

Duke Wen of Xiping
- Chinese: 西平文公
Transcriptions
Standard Mandarin
- Hanyu Pinyin: Xīpíng Wén Gōng
Middle Chinese
- Middle Chinese: /seibˠiæŋ mɨun kuŋ/

Prince Wen of Liang
- Traditional Chinese: 涼文王
- Simplified Chinese: 凉文王
Transcriptions
Standard Mandarin
- Hanyu Pinyin: Liáng Wén Wáng
Middle Chinese
- Middle Chinese: /lɨɐŋ mɨun ɦʉɐŋ/

Posthumous name: (Jin)
- Chinese: 忠成
- Literal meaning: "faithful and successful"
Transcriptions
Standard Mandarin
- Hanyu Pinyin: Zhōngchéng
Middle Chinese
- Middle Chinese: /ʈɨuŋd͡ʑiᴇŋ/

Posthumous name: (Internal)
- Chinese: 文
- Literal meaning: "civil"
Transcriptions
Standard Mandarin
- Hanyu Pinyin: Wén
Middle Chinese
- Middle Chinese: /mɨun/

Zhang Jun (張駿 Zhāng Jùn; 307 – 28 June 346), courtesy name Gongting (公庭), formally Duke Zhongcheng of Xiping (西平忠成公, posthumous name given by Jin Dynasty) or Duke Wen of Xiping (西平文公, posthumous name used internally in Former Liang) was a ruler of the Chinese Former Liang state. During his reign, he at times used the Jin-created title of Duke of Xiping, but when forced to submit to Former Zhao and Later Zhao, he used the title "Prince of Liang". Late in his reign, even when not under Later Zhao's pressure, he claimed the title of "Acting Prince of Liang." During the brief reign of his son Zhang Zuo, he was honored as Prince Wen of Liang (涼文王). The Book of Jin describes Zhang Jun as having an extraordinary appearance and was talented at literature. However, he was also an extravagant and dissipated man.

== Early life ==
Zhang Jun was the son of Zhang Shi (張寔), the Jin governor of Liang Province (涼州, modern central and western Gansu) and the Duke of Xiping. In 320, Zhang Shi was assassinated by his guards Yan She (閻涉) and Zhao Ang (趙卬), who were followers of the magician Liu Hong (劉弘), who had falsely prophesied that he would be the ruler of Liang Province. Zhang Shi's brother Zhang Mao captured and executed Liu and his followers. Because Zhang Jun was still young (aged 13) at the time, Zhang Shi's subordinates requested that Zhang Mao take over the governorship. (Because Zhang Mao also declared a general pardon at the time, a power normally reserved for an emperor, this was often viewed as the date of Former Liang's independence from Jin.) Zhang Mao made Zhang Jun a general, and later in the year named him his heir. On 21 June 324, Zhang Mao died, and Zhang Jun succeeded him. Because Zhang Mao had previously been forced to submit to Former Zhao and was given the title the Prince of Liang, Zhang Jun carried that title as well, even though internally he used the Jin-vested title of Duke of Xiping.

== Early reign ==
In 326, Zhang Jun, in fear of Han-Zhao, forcibly relocated the people of Longxi (隴西) and Nan'an (南安, collectively roughly Dingxi, Gansu) Commanderies to the capital Guzang (姑臧, in modern Wuwei, Gansu). He also sought peace with Cheng-Han's emperor Li Xiong and further tried to persuade Li Xiong to become a Jin vassal. Li Xiong agreed to peace and further did not completely rebuff Zhang Jun's overture, but also did not actually become a Jin vassal.

In 327, after hearing news that Former Zhao had suffered losses at Later Zhao's hands, Zhang Jun disavowed all titles granted by Former Zhao and returned to Jin titles, and attacked Former Zhao's Qin Province (秦州, modern eastern Gansu). Former Zhao's prince Liu Yin counterattacked, and, after defeating Former Liang general Han Pu (韓璞), captured all Former Liang territory south of the Yellow River and further crossed the river, but did not advance further. However, Zhang Jun did not resubmit to Former Zhao. As Former Zhao disintegrated and fell to Later Zhao in 329 after its emperor Liu Yao was captured by Later Zhao forces, Former Liang took the opportunity to regain lands south of the Yellow River. In 330, Later Zhao's emperor Shi Le sent messengers to persuade Former Liang to submit (by granting him honors, including the nine bestowments), but Zhang Jun refused and detained Shi Le's messengers. Later in the year, however, after Later Zhao's general Shi Sheng (石生) the Prince of Hedong defeated the nearby Xiongnu chieftain Shi Qiang (石羌), Zhang Jun became apprehensive and submitted to Later Zhao.

In 333, in the aftermaths of Shi Le's death and the coup by his nephew Shi Hu, a number of Later Zhao generals rebelled and tried to seek Jin and Former Liang assistance. Former Liang tried to ally itself with one of these generals, the Di chief Pu Hong (蒲洪). However, in light of Shi Hu's victory over most of the other generals, Pu soon submitted to Shi Hu. Shi Hu, however, did not appear to consider attacking Former Liang, and, not having to fight Later Zhao for years, by 335 Zhang Jun's domain was described as being so rich and strong and under his capable leadership that it also became overlord over a number of kingdoms in the Western Regions, which offered tribute to Zhang Jun. He submitted a plan to Emperor Cheng of Jin requesting to attack Later Zhao and/or Cheng-Han jointly with Jin forces, but the plan was not acted upon by Emperor Cheng.

== Late reign ==
In 339, Zhang Jun transferred some of his authorities to his heir apparent, Zhang Chonghua. In 340, he offered tribute to Shi Hu, but in his petition he used arrogant words. Shi Hu was angered and wanted to kill his messenger, but Shi Hu's official Shi Pu (石璞) was able to persuade him to overlook Zhang Jun's arrogance.

In 344, a battle between Former Liang and Later Zhao forces was mentioned, perhaps indicating that the relationship was not as peaceful as before.

In early 346, Zhang Jun attacked the Xiyu kingdom Yanqi (焉耆, in modern Bayin'gholin Mongol Autonomous Prefecture, Xinjiang), and Yanqui submitted to him. By this point, he was described as having taken the title Acting Prince of Liang (假涼王) and using styles that were usually reserved for emperors.

In summer 346, Zhang Jun died, and was succeeded by his heir apparent Zhang Chonghua.

== Era name? ==
Most historical sources indicate that Zhang Jun, like his father Zhang Shi and his uncle Zhang Mao, continued to use Emperor Min of Jin's era name Jianxing (both to show continued allegiance to Jin and to distance himself from Emperor Yuan of Jin and his line of Eastern Jin emperors). But, some sources indicate that he instead used the era name Taiyuan (太元 tài yuán 324–346). A current theory is that his era name was used internally while the Jianxing era name was used when communicating with other states.

== Personal information ==
- Father
  - Zhang Shi, Duke Yuan of Xiping
- Wife
  - Princess Yan
- Major Concubines
  - Lady Ma, mother of Zhang Chonghua
  - Mother of Zhang Tianxi, variously reported as Lady Liu or Lady Yan
- Children
  - Zhang Zuo (張祚), the Marquess of Changning, later Prince Wei
  - Zhang Chonghua (張重華), the heir apparent, later Duke Jinglie
  - Zhang Tianxi (張天錫), the Marquess of Changning (created 354), later Duke Dao

== Notes ==
Prince Wen of (Former) Liang House of Zhang Born: 307 Died: 346
Chinese royalty
Preceded by Zhang Mao	Prince of Former Liang; 324–346	Succeeded by Zhang Chonghua
Chinese nobility
Preceded by Zhang Mao	Duke of Xiping; 324–346	Succeeded by Zhang Chonghua
