= Princess Pei =

Princess Pei (裴王后, personal name unknown) (died 354) was the wife of the Chinese state Former Liang's ruler Zhang Chonghua. Very little is known about her, including when Zhang Chonghua made her his princess. After Zhang Chonghua's death in 353, Zhang Chonghua's brother Zhang Zuo who served as regent, consolidated power by deposing his young nephew Zhang Yaoling who happened to be the designated heir, and with the full approval of the mother of Zhang Chonghua, Princess Dowager Ma, (who was said to have an affair with him) thereby assuming formal control over Former Liang. In early 354, after taking over the role of ruler, Zhang Zuo then, for reasons unknown, executed Princess Pei.

Chinese royalty
Preceded by Princess Yan	Princess of Former Liang; 346?–354	Succeeded by Empress Xin
