= Zhang Guan =

Chinese regent-general of Former Liang (died 359)

Zhang Guan (Chinese: 張瓘) (died c.July 359) was a general and regent of the Chinese Former Liang dynasty, during the early reign of the young prince Zhang Xuanjing.

Zhang Guan was a distant relative of the ruling family of the Former Liang. He was serving as the governor of He Province (河州, modern southwestern Gansu and eastern Qinghai) under Zhang Xuanjing's uncle Zhang Zuo, who had seized the throne from Zhang Xuanjing's older brother Zhang Yaoling in 354. Zhang Zuo, whose reign was marked by violence and extravagance, was fearful of Zhang Guan's military power, so he sent his subordinate Suo Fu (索孚) to replace Zhang Guan while ordering Zhang Guan to attack the Xiongnu tribes which had rebelled. He then set up an ambush against Zhang Guan, ready to seize him and/or kill him. However, news leaked, and Zhang Guan executed Suo and then proceeded against the capital, announcing that he was going to store Zhang Yaoling. He won victories over Zhang Zuo's forces and approached the capital Guzang (姑臧, in modern Wuwei, Gansu). He was joined in his cause by the general Song Hun, who also marched on Guzang. In response, Zhang Zuo executed Zhang Yaoling by beating him to death.

That move, however, did not save Zhang Zuo. As Song arrived at the capital, Zhang Zuo ordered that Zhang Guan's brother Zhang Ju (張琚) and son Zhang Song (張嵩) be arrested and killed, but Zhang Ju and Zhang Song instead started an uprising within Guzang and opened the city gates to allow Song Hun's forces to enter. Zhang Zuo's own forces turned on him and killed him. Song Hun and Zhang Ju then declared the six-year-old Zhang Xuanjing the Duke of Xiping—a hereditary Jin dynasty-created title that his family had held for generations. Upon Zhang Guan's subsequent arrival at Guzang, he became the regent, and he instead had Zhang Xuanjing claim the title of Prince of Liang, a title that the Jin dynasty did not confer, but continued to claim to be a Jin vassal. He had himself made the governor of Liang Province (涼州, modern central and western Gansu) and the Duke of Zhangyi. In early 356, in response to diplomatic and implicit military pressure that Former Qin put on the state, Zhang Guan submitted Former Liang to formal Former Qin authority.

Once Zhang Guan became regent he became dictatorial and suspicious, making awards and punishments based on his own personal whim. He became apprehensive of Song Hun, and considered killing Song Hun and his brother Song Cheng (宋澄), and further considered deposing Zhang Xuanjing and making himself prince. Once Song Hun heard this news, he gathered his troops and declared Zhang Guan to be treasonous, claiming to have authorization from Zhang Xuanjing's grandmother Princess Dowager Ma to kill him. A battle soon developed within Guzang, but Song prevailed, and Zhang Guan and his brother Zhang Ju both committed suicide, and their clan was slaughtered. Song Hun became the regent.
