= Princess Yan =

Princess Yan (嚴王后, personal name unknown) was the wife of the Chinese state Former Liang's ruler Zhang Jun.

It is not known when Zhang Jun married her, but it is known that she carried the title of princess even though Zhang, for most of his reign, used the Jin Dynasty (266–420)-created title of Duke of Xiping, and only late in his reign used the title "Acting Prince of Liang" (假涼王). After Zhang Jun's death in 346, his son and heir Zhang Chonghua honored her as "Grand Princess Dowager" and his own mother Lady Ma as "Princess Dowager." No further reference was made to her; by the time Zhang Chonghua died in 353, Lady Yan appeared to have died, because only Zhang Chonghua's mother Princess Dowager Ma was mentioned.

Chinese royalty
| Preceded by None? (dynasty founded)^{1} | Princess of Former Liang; 324?–346 | Succeeded by Princess Pei |
