= Zhang Zuo =

Chinese ruler of Former Liang (died 355)

Zhang Zuo 張祚
- Emperor of Former Liang

Ruler of Former Liang
- Reign: 353–355
- Predecessor: Zhang Yaoling
- Successor: Zhang Xuanjing
- Died: 355
Names
- Zhang Zuo (張祚)
Era name and dates
- Hépíng (和平): 354–355
Regnal name
- Grand Commander, Grand General, Governor of Liang Province, Duke of Liang (大都督 大將軍 涼州牧 涼公, 353–354); Emperor (since 354)
Posthumous name
- Prince Wei (威王, honored by Zhang Tianxi)
- Dynasty: Former Liang
- Father: Zhang Jun

Zhang Zuo

courtesy name Taibo
- Chinese: 太伯
Transcriptions
Standard Mandarin
- Hanyu Pinyin: Tàibó
Middle Chinese
- Middle Chinese: /tʰɑi^{H} pˠæk̚/

Prince Wei of (Former) Liang
- Traditional Chinese: (前)涼威王
- Simplified Chinese: (前)凉威王
Transcriptions
Standard Mandarin
- Hanyu Pinyin: (Qián) Liáng Wēi wáng
Middle Chinese
- Middle Chinese: /d͡zen lɨɐŋ ʔʉi ɦʉɐŋ/

Posthumous name
- Chinese: Wei (威, weī)
- Literal meaning: "aggressive"
Transcriptions
Standard Mandarin
- Hanyu Pinyin: Wēi
Middle Chinese
- Middle Chinese: /ʔʉi/

Zhang Zuo (Chinese: 張祚; died c.November 355), courtesy name Taibo (太伯), formally Prince Wei of (Former) Liang ((前)涼威王) was a ruler of the Chinese state Former Liang. He was the only ruler of Former Liang to formally declare a break from Jin Dynasty (266–420), and historical sources variously report him as having declared himself an emperor (per Jin Shu) or a prince (per Zizhi Tongjian). He was commonly viewed as a usurper (Note: having seized the throne from his nephew Zhang Yaoling after his brother Zhang Chonghua's death) and initially not acknowledged as a Former Liang ruler, but his brother Zhang Tianxi later nevertheless gave him the posthumous name of Wei.

== During the reigns of Zhang Chonghua and Zhang Yaoling ==
Little is known about Zhang Zuo's personal background, other than that he was Zhang Jun's oldest son, but was not designated heir apparent. His younger brother Zhang Chonghua was, even though neither was born of Zhang Jun's wife Princess Yan. Neither his mother nor his birth year was recorded in history. He was praised for being strong, brave and knowledgeable, and either Zhang Jun or Zhang Chonghua created him the Marquess of Changning.

During the reign of his brother Zhang Chonghua, Zhang Zuo was trusted by his brother, and despite warnings by Chang Ju (常據) and Xie Ai, Zhang Chonghua, for a long time, intended for Zhang Zuo to serve as regent for his son Zhang Yaoling. Late in 353, however, as Zhang Chonghua was gravely ill, he ordered that Xie be recalled to be warrant—but Zhang Zuo and Zhang Chonghua's attendants Zhao Zhang (趙長) and Wei Qi (尉緝), who had conspired to take over power, blocked Zhang Chonghua's order and instead forged an order making Zhang Zuo regent. Zhang Chonghua soon died, and he was succeeded by Zhang Yaoling, at age nine, but real power was in Zhang Zuo's hands.

Zhang Zuo, who had by this point engaged in an affair with Zhang Chonghua's mother Princess Dowager Ma, soon made his move to formally take over. With Princess Ma's approval, Zhang Yaoling was deposed in early 354 and replaced with Zhang Zuo, who soon showed his cruel side, as he put Xie Ai and Zhang Chonghua's wife Princess Pei to death.

== Reign ==
Early in 354, Zhang Zuo declared a clear break from Jin—a move that none of his predecessors had dared to do. He completely repudiated the Jin era name Jianxing (declared by Emperor Min of Jin and used in at least some facility by every Zhang patriarch since his grandfather Zhang Shi (張寔)) and changed the era name to Heping. He also declared himself a greater title than the Jin-bestowed Duke of Xiping—although what that title was is a matter of historical controversy, as Jin Shu indicated that he declared himself emperor (and created his wife Lady Xin empress and his sons princes) and Zizhi Tongjian indicated that he declared himself Prince of Liang, although the inclusion by Jin Shu of a declaration of independence by Zhang Zuo appears to lend credibility to the Jin Shu account. (Note: The Zizhi Tongjian recorded that Zhang Zuo performed rituals and used rites reserved for emperors. Thus, Tongjian implied that while Zhang Zuo declared himself prince de jure, he was de facto an emperor.)

Later that year, Zhang Zuo nevertheless sent his general Wang Zhuo (王擢) to assist the Jin general Sima Xun, who was commanding an auxiliary force in conjunction with the main force commanded by Huan Wen against Former Qin. Wang submitted a report to Zhang Zuo stating that Huan was capable of commanding large armies and had great ambition, which caused Zhang Zuo to panic. Oddly, he decided to assassinate Wang, but failed. He then mobilized his troops, ready to resist Huan or to flee in case Huan destroyed Former Qin and then turned his attention on him. After Huan was forced to withdraw after his food supplies ran out, however, Zhang Zuo attacked Wang, forcing Wang to surrender to Former Qin.

Zhang Zuo's rule, according to traditional accounts, was one filled with debauchery, cruelty, and extravagance. He was said to not only have had an affair with Princess Dowager Ma, but committed incest with all of Zhang Chonghua's daughters. He became apprehensive of his general Zhang Guan (張瓘), so he sent Zhang Guan on an expedition, but sent another army to ambush him. The news leaked, however, and Zhang Guan turned his army against the capital Guzang (姑臧, in modern Wuwei, Gansu). He declared that Zhang Zuo should be deposed and Zhang Yaoling should be restored. He was soon joined by another major general, Song Hun (宋混). In response, Zhang Zuo had his young nephew put to death by beating.

That action could not save him, however, as Zhang Guan and Song continued their advances on the capital. Zhang Zuo ordered that Zhang Guan's brother Zhang Ju (張琚) and son Zhang Song (張嵩) be arrested and executed, but instead Zhang Ju and Zhang Son started an uprising within Guzang and opened the city gates to welcome in Song's forces. Zhang Zuo's former co-conspirators Zhao Zhang (赵长) and Wei Qi (尉缉) became apprehensive and forced Princess Dowager Ma to declare Zhang Chonghua's younger son Zhang Xuanjing as the new ruler. Guards still loyal to Zhang Zuo killed Zhao and Wei, but soon fell apart in the confusion, and Zhang Zuo was killed. (Note: The Spring and Autumn Annals of the Sixteen Kingdoms recorded that Zhang Zhuo was wounded by Zhao Zhang and then killed by a cook, Xu Li.) Song cut off his head and put his two sons to death.

== Personal information ==
- Father
  - Zhang Jun (Duke Zhongcheng)
- Wife
  - Empress (or Princess) Xin (created 354)
- Children
  - Zhang Taihe (張太和), the Crown Prince (created 354, executed by army officers 355)
  - Zhang Tingjian (張庭堅), the Prince or Marquess of Jiankang (created 354, executed by army officers 355)

== Notes ==
Prince Wei of (Former) Liang House of Zhang Died: 355
Chinese royalty
Vacant Title last held by Zhang Chonghua	Prince of Former Liang; 354–355	Succeeded by Zhang Xuanjing
