= Conciliabulum =

Latin word

Conciliabulum (lit. 'conciliable' or 'conciliabule') is a Latin word meaning a place of assembly. Its implication transferred to a gathering, such as a conventicle or conference.

In the history of the Catholic Church, it is frequently applied as a diminutive to gatherings of bishops or cardinals which do not have recognition as full or even regional Church Councils or synods. An example is the 1511 council convened at Pisa by Louis XII of France and commonly called the Conciliabulum of Pisa, in opposition to Pope Julius II, which brought together four cardinals.
