= Zhang Shi (Former Liang) =

Zhang Shi 張寔
- Prince of Former Liang (posthumously)

Inspector of Liang Province
- Reign: 314–320
- Predecessor: Zhang Gui
- Successor: Zhang Mao
- Died: 320
Names
- Zhang Shi (張寔)
Era name and dates
- Jiànxīng (建興) (Note: Used the era name of Emperor Min of Jin.): 317–320
Regnal name
- Given tally, Commander in charge of military affairs in Liang Province, General of the Western Household, Inspector of Liang Province, Colonel to Guard the Qiang people, Duke of Xiping (持節 都督涼州諸軍事 西中郎將 涼州刺史 領護羌校尉 西平公)
Posthumous name
- Duke Yuan (元公, honored by Eastern Jin); Prince Ming (明王, honored by Zhang Zuo)
Temple name
- Gaozu (高祖, honored by Zhang Zuo)
- Dynasty: Former Liang
- Father: Zhang Gui

Zhang Shi (Chinese: 張寔, died c.August 320) was the regional warlord and ruler in the Former Liang state. He was the eldest son of Zhang Gui, who was a governor of Liang province under the Jin Dynasty. In June 314, Zhang Shi inherited the title Duke of Xiping as well as the governorship of Liang from his father. He was posthumously known as Prince Ming of Former Liang (Chinese: 涼明王)

When the Western Jin Dynasty collapsed, Zhang Shi declared Liang an independent regional state, but decided to retain the Jin calendar system. In 320 AD, he was killed by an associate named Yan Sha (Chinese: 閻沙). Zhang's younger brother Zhang Mao replaced him.

== Notes ==
Duke Ming of Xiping House of Zhang Died: 320 AD
Chinese nobility
Preceded by Zhang Gui	Duke of Xiping; 314–320 AD	Succeeded by Zhang Mao
