= Empress Dowager Ma (Former Liang) =

Princess Dowager Ma (馬太后, personal name unknown; died 363 (Note: In Zizhi Tongjian, Lady Ma was referred to as such (马氏).)) was the mother of the Chinese state Former Liang's ruler Zhang Chonghua. She was a concubine of Zhang Chonghua's father Zhang Jun.

== Life ==
Nothing is known about Lady Ma's activities during Zhang Jun's reign, other than her status as his heir apparent's mother. This implies that Zhang Jun's wife Princess Yan had no sons. After Zhang Jun's death in 346, Zhang Chonghua succeeded him and honored her as "Empress Dowager" while honoring Princess Yan as "Grand Empress Dowager."

After Zhang Chonghua died in 353, his son Zhang Yaoling carried the Jin Dynasty (266–420)-created title Duke of Xiping and was the titular ruler, but actual power was in the hands of Empress Dowager Ma and Zhang Chonghua's older brother Zhang Zuo. Most historians believed that she had an affair with Zhang Zuo, and later that year, she deposed Zhang Yaoling and replaced him with Zhang Zuo.

In 355, however, the overly extravagant and cruel Zhang Zuo was deposed and killed by a coalition of officials, including Zhang Guan (張瓘) and Song Hun, and they pressured her into making Zhang Chonghua's younger son, Zhang Xuanjing, the new ruler. (Note: Zhang Yaoling had been killed by Zhang Zuo earlier that year.) Zhang Guan initially served as regent, but was killed in 359 by Song Hun, who served as regent until his death in 361. He was replaced by his brother Song Cheng (宋澄), who was in turn killed by Zhang Yong (張邕) later that year.

It was said that Empress Dowager Ma also carried on an affair with Zhang Yong, who was in turn overthrown by Zhang Jun's youngest son Zhang Tianxi late in the year. In 363, Empress Dowager Ma died.
