= Flavius Martinus =

Flavius Martinus was a vicarius of Roman Britain c. 353 under Constantius II.

He tried to control the violent recriminations following the defeat of Magnentius. Martinus tried to rein in the vengeance of Constantius' notary Paulus Catena who had been sent to Britain to ruthlessly hunt down opponents to the emperor. Faced with Paul's refusal to release even those suspects who had been proved innocent, Martinus threatened resignation but this only resulted in accusations being made at him directly as well.

In desperation, Martinus attacked Paulus with a sword. The attack was unsuccessful and he committed suicide.

Ammianus praises Martinus for his bravery in seeking to protect the innocent during the atmosphere of fear and oppression in Britain at the time.
