= 418 =

418 in various calendars
- Gregorian calendar: 418; CDXVIII
- Ab urbe condita: 1171
- Assyrian calendar: 5168
- Balinese saka calendar: 339–340
- Bengali calendar: −176 – −175
- Berber calendar: 1368
- Buddhist calendar: 962
- Burmese calendar: −220
- Byzantine calendar: 5926–5927
- Chinese calendar: 丁巳年 (Fire Snake); 3115 or 2908 — to — 戊午年 (Earth Horse); 3116 or 2909
- Coptic calendar: 134–135
- Discordian calendar: 1584
- Ethiopian calendar: 410–411
- Hebrew calendar: 4178–4179
- Hindu calendars
- Vikram Samvat: 474–475
- Shaka Samvat: 339–340
- Kali Yuga: 3518–3519
- Holocene calendar: 10418
- Iranian calendar: 204 BP – 203 BP
- Islamic calendar: 210 BH – 209 BH
- Javanese calendar: 302–303
- Julian calendar: 418; CDXVIII
- Korean calendar: 2751
- Minguo calendar: 1494 before ROC 民前1494年
- Nanakshahi calendar: −1050
- Seleucid era: 729/730 AG
- Thai solar calendar: 960–961
- Tibetan calendar: མེ་མོ་སྦྲུལ་ལོ་ (female Fire-Snake); 544 or 163 or −609 — to — ས་ཕོ་རྟ་ལོ་ (male Earth-Horse); 545 or 164 or −608

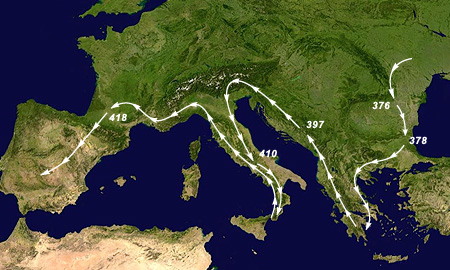
Visigothic migrations (376–418)

Year 418 (CDXVIII) was a common year starting on Tuesday of the Julian calendar. At the time, it was known as the Year of the Consulship of Honorius and Theodosius (or, less frequently, year 1171 Ab urbe condita). The denomination 418 for this year has been used since the early medieval period, when the Anno Domini calendar era became the prevalent method in Europe for naming years.

== Events ==
=== By place ===
==== Roman Empire ====
- Emperor Honorius bribes Wallia, king of the Visigoths, into regaining Hispania for the Roman Empire. His victory over the Vandals in 416 forces them to retire to Baetica. The Visigothic territory in Gaul now extends from the Garonne to the Loire, and becomes known as the Visigothic Kingdom.
- Theodoric I becomes king of the Visigoths. He completes the settlements in Gallia Aquitania and expands his military power to the south.

=== By topic ===
==== Religion ====
- December 28 – Pope Boniface I succeeds Zosimus as the 42nd pope.
- Eulalius is elected antipope of Rome. He claims in a letter to Honorius his recognition as pope.

== Births ==
- Ricimer, Germanic Roman general
- Yuryaku, emperor of Japan (approximate date)

== Deaths ==
- December 26 – Pope Zosimus
- Attaces, king of the Alans
- Wallia, king of the Visigoths
