= Zhang Yaoling =

Zhang Yaoling 張曜靈
- Duke of Xiping

Ruler of Former Liang
- Reign: 353
- Predecessor: Zhang Chonghua
- Successor: Zhang Zuo
- Born: 344
- Died: 355 (aged 10–11)
Names
- Zhang Yaoling (張曜靈)
Era name and dates
- Jiànxīng (建興) (Note: Used the era name of the Emperor Min of Jin.): 353
Regnal name
- Grand Marshal, Colonel to Guard the Qiang people, Inspector of Liang Province, Duke of Xiping (大司馬 護羌校尉 涼州刺史 西平公)
Posthumous name
- Duke Ai (哀公, honored by Former Liang)
- Dynasty: Former Liang
- Father: Zhang Chonghua

Zhang Yaoling
- Traditional Chinese: 張曜靈
- Simplified Chinese: 张曜灵
Transcriptions
Standard Mandarin
- Hanyu Pinyin: Zhāng Yàolíng
Middle Chinese
- Middle Chinese: /ʈɨɐŋ jiᴇu^{H} leŋ/

Alternative Chinese name
- Chinese: 元舒
Transcriptions
Standard Mandarin
- Hanyu Pinyin: Yuánshū
Middle Chinese
- Middle Chinese: /ŋʉɐnɕɨʌ/

Second alternative Chinese name
- Chinese: 哀
- Literal meaning: "lamentable"
Transcriptions
Standard Mandarin
- Hanyu Pinyin: Aī
Middle Chinese
- Middle Chinese: /ʔʌi/

Zhang Yaoling (Chinese: 張曜靈; 344–355), courtesy name Yuanshu (元舒), formally Duke Ai of Xiping, was briefly the ruler of the Chinese state Former Liang in 353 and early 354.

Zhang Yaoling was the oldest son of his father Zhang Chonghua (Duke Jinglie) and therefore was designated his heir apparent. When Zhang Chonghua died in 353, he succeeded Zhang Chonghua as the ruler of Former Liang (with the title Duke of Xiping), but actual power was in the hands of his uncle, Zhang Zuo the Marquess of Changning. In early 354, Zhang Zuo, who had carried on an affair with Zhang Chonghua's mother Princess Dowager Ma, gained her support to take over as ruler, and Zhang Yaoling was demoted to the title of Marquess of Liangning.

Zhang Zuo was a violent and frivolous ruler, and there was soon much opposition against him, particularly after he completely broke away from Jin Dynasty. In 355, the generals Zhang Guan and Song Hun rebelled against Zhang Zuo and announced that they wished to restore Zhang Yaoling. In response, Zhang Zuo executed Zhang Yaoling by beating him to death. Zhang Zuo, however, would soon be overthrown and replaced by Zhang Yaoling's younger brother Zhang Xuanjing.

== Notes ==
Duke Ai of Xiping House of Zhang Born: 344 Died: 355
Chinese nobility
Preceded by Zhang Chonghua	Duke of Xiping; 353–354 with Zhang Zuo (353–354)	Vacant Title next held by Zhang Xuanjing
