= Zhang Xuanjing =

Chinese ruler of Former Liang (350-363)

Zhang Xuanjing 張玄靚
- Prince of Former Liang

Ruler of Former Liang
- Reign: 355–363
- Predecessor: Zhang Zuo
- Successor: Zhang Tianxi
- Regent: Zhang Guan (355–359); Song Hun (359–361); Song Cheng (361); Zhang Yong (361); Zhang Tianxi (361–363)
- Born: 350
- Died: 363 (aged 12–13)
Names
- Zhang Xuanjing (張玄靚) (Note: This name was recorded in Jin Shu and Zizhi Tongjian.) or Zhang Xuanjing (張玄靖) (Note: This name was recorded in Shiliuguo Chunqiu.)
Era dates
- Jiànxīng (建興) (Note: Used the era name of Emperor Min of Jin.): 355–361; Shēngpíng (升平) (Note: Used the era name of Emperor Mu of Jin.): 361–363
Regnal name
- 355; Grand General, Governor of Liang Province, Colonel to Guard the Qiang people, Duke of Xiping, Acting Prince of Liang (大將軍 涼州牧 護羌校尉 西平公); 355–359; Prince of Liang (涼王); 359–361; Grand General, Governor of Liang Province, Colonel to Guard the Qiang people, Duke of Xiping (大將軍 涼州牧 護羌校尉 西平公); Since 361; Grand Commander in charge of military affairs in Longyou, Colonel to Guard the Qiang people, Duke of Xiping (大都督隴右諸軍事 護羌校尉 涼州刺史 西平公)
Posthumous name
- Duke Jingdao (敬悼公, honored by Eastern Jin); Duke Chong (沖公, honored by Former Liang)
- Dynasty: Former Liang
- Father: Zhang Chonghua

Zhang Xuanjing

courtesy name Yuan'an
- Chinese: 元安
Transcriptions
Standard Mandarin
- Hanyu Pinyin: Yuánān
Middle Chinese
- Middle Chinese: /ŋʉɐn ʔɑn/

Duke Jingdao of Xiping
- Chinese: 西平敬悼公
Transcriptions
Standard Mandarin
- Hanyu Pinyin: Xīpíng Jìngdào Gōng
Middle Chinese
- Middle Chinese: /seibˠiæŋ kˠiæŋ^{H}dɑu^{H} kuŋ/

Duke Chong of Xiping
- Chinese: 西平文公
Transcriptions
Middle Chinese
- Middle Chinese: /seibˠiæŋ mɨun kuŋ/

Prince Chong of (Former) Liang
- Traditional Chinese: (前)涼沖王
- Simplified Chinese: (前)凉冲王
Transcriptions
Standard Mandarin
- Hanyu Pinyin: (Qián) Liáng Chōng Wáng
Middle Chinese
- Middle Chinese: /d͡zen lɨɐŋ ɖɨuŋ ɦʉɐŋ/

Posthumous name: (Jin)
- Chinese: 敬悼
- Literal meaning: "respectful and fearful"
Transcriptions
Standard Mandarin
- Hanyu Pinyin: Jìngdaò
Middle Chinese
- Middle Chinese: /kˠiæŋ^{H} dɑu^{H}/

Posthumous name: (Internal)
- Chinese: 沖
- Literal meaning: "young-ruling"
Transcriptions
Standard Mandarin
- Hanyu Pinyin: Chōng
Middle Chinese
- Middle Chinese: /ɖɨuŋ/

Zhang Xuanjing (張玄靚 or 張玄靖) (350–363), courtesy name Yuan'an (元安), formally Duke Jingdao of Xiping (西平敬悼公 (Note: posthumous name given by Jin Dynasty (266–420))) or Duke Chong of Xiping (西平沖公 (Note: posthumous name used internally in Former Liang)) was a ruler of the Chinese state Former Liang. He became the titular ruler at the young age of five after his violent uncle Zhang Zuo, who had seized the title from his older brother Zhang Yaoling and subsequently killed him, was himself killed in a coup. In the Spring and Autumn Annals of the Sixteen Kingdoms, Zhang Xuanjing was given the posthumous name Prince Chong of (Former) Liang (Chinese: (前)涼沖王).

The years of his rule were characterized by political instability, as he went through a progression of regents who overthrew each other -- Zhang Guan (張瓘), Song Hun (宋混), Song Cheng (宋澄), Zhang Yong (張邕), and finally his uncle Zhang Tianxi, who eventually had him killed and took over the title in 363. During Zhang Guan's regency, he temporarily used the title Prince of Liang, but after Song Hun overthrew Zhang Guan, he again used the Jin-created title of Duke of Xiping.

== Early life ==
Zhang Xuanjing was born in 350, during the reign of his father Zhang Chonghua (Duke Jinglie). His mother was likely Zhang Chonghua's concubine Lady Guo (as he honored her as princess dowager in 363, which he would have had little reason to do if she were not his mother). He had an older brother, Zhang Yaoling, who was his father's heir apparent.

In 353, Zhang Chonghua died, and Zhang Yaoling became the ruler (as Duke Ai), but actual power was in the hands of Zhang Chonghua's older brother Zhang Zuo, who was having an affair with Zhang Chonghua's mother Princess Dowager Ma and received her support in early 354 to depose Zhang Yaoling and claim the throne himself. Later that year, when he declared independence from Jin Dynasty (266–420), which Former Liang had been a titular vassal of, he created Zhang Xuanjing the Marquess of Liangwu.

In 356, the violent and capricious Zhang Zuo was overthrown and killed by the generals Zhang Guan and Song Hun. Initially, Song had Zhang Xuanjing claim the Jin-created title of Duke of Xiping, a title that his ancestors had carried for generations, but Zhang Guan overruled Song and had the young ruler claim the title Prince of Liang, a title that Jin had declined to grant previously. Zhang Guan served as regent.

== Under the regency of Zhang Guan ==
Despite his having Zhang Xuanjing claim a non-Jin-created title, Zhang Guan nevertheless continued to claim that Former Liang was a Jin vassal. In 356, however, under diplomatic and implied military pressure from Former Qin, Zhang Guan, on Zhang Xuanjing's behalf, formally submitted to Former Qin as a vassal.

Zhang Guan governed with a heavy hand, based on his own whim. In 359, he became suspicious of Song Hun and wanted to kill him and his brother Song Cheng (宋澄), and then depose Zhang Xuanjing and take the throne himself. Song Hun received news of this, however, and started an uprising within the capital Guzang (姑臧, in modern Wuwei, Gansu). Song's and Zhang Guan's forces battled within the city, but eventually Song prevailed, and Zhang Guan and his brother Zhang Ju (張琚) committed suicide. Their clan was slaughtered. Song Hun became regent.

== Under the regencies of Song Hun and Song Cheng ==
Song Hun's regency was better received, as Song emphasized faithfulness and tolerance. He also had Zhang Xuanjing disclaim the title Prince of Liang and return to the Jin-created title Duke of Xiping. The people appeared to be happy about his regency. However, turmoil came again in 361, after Song Hun died. Under Song Hun's recommendation, his brother Song Cheng became regent, but Song Cheng, not as skillful as Song Hun, was soon killed by the general Zhang Yong (張邕), and his clan was slaughtered. Zhang Yong and Zhang Xuanjing's uncle Zhang Tianxi became coregents, but with Zhang Yong having the bulk of power.

== Under the regencies of Zhang Yong and Zhang Tianxi ==
After becoming regent, Zhang Yong became arrogant, sexually immoral, and dictatorial, and he often executed officials, causing the nobles and the officials to be fearful. Zhang Tianxi's assistants Liu Su (劉肅), comparing Zhang Yong to Zhang Zuo, persuaded him that he needed to act against Zhang Yong, and later in 361, Zhang Tianxi had Liu Su and another assistant, Zhao Baiju (趙白駒) attempt to assassinate Zhang Yong, but failed. Zhang Yong then gathered his troops and attacked Zhang Tianxi, but Zhang Tianxi persuaded Zhang Yong's troops that he was avenging the Song clan and that Zhang Yong's next move was going to slaughter the royal Zhang clan. Zhang's forces, hearing this, abandoned him, and Zhang Yong committed suicide. His clan was slaughtered, and Zhang Tianxi became sole regent. Zhang Tianxi ended the practice of using Emperor Min of Jin's era name Jianxing and instead started using the current era name of Jin Dynasty (Note: at the time, Emperor Mu's Shengping), to show even greater affinity with Jin.

In 363, Princess Dowager Ma died, and Zhang Xuanjing honored Lady Guo as princess dowager. She became concerned that Zhang Tianxi was acting dictatorially, and she conspired with the high-level official Zhang Qin (張欽) to kill Zhang Tianxi, but the news leaked, and Zhang Qin and other conspirators were put to death. Zhang Xuanjing became fearful and offered to yield the throne to Zhang Tianxi, but Zhang Tianxi refused. A month later, however, he had Liu Su lead soldiers into the palace to assassinate the 13-year-old Zhang Xuanjing, but claimed that Zhang Xuanjing died of an illness. Zhang Tianxi took the throne himself.

== Era name ==
- Taishi (太始 taì shǐ) 355–356

After 356, the era name of Emperor Min of Jin, Jianxing, was used until 361, when Former Liang switched to using the current era names used by Jin—therefore, Emperor Mu's Shengping in 361 and Emperor Ai's Longhe in 362–363.

== Personal information ==
- Father
  - Zhang Chonghua (Duke Jinglie)
- Mother
  - Likely Lady Guo

== Notes ==
Prince Chong of (Former) Liang House of Zhang Born: 350 Died: 363
Chinese royalty
Preceded by Zhang Zuo	Prince of Former Liang; 355–363 with Zhang Guan (355–359); Song Hun (359–361); Song Cheng (361); Zhang Yong (361); Zhang Tianxi (361–363)	Extinct
Chinese nobility
Vacant Title last held by Zhang Yaoling	Duke of Xiping; 355–363	Succeeded by Zhang Tianxi
