= Spring and Autumn Annals of the Sixteen Kingdoms =

Chinese historical work

- Author: Cui Hong
- Original title: 十六國春秋
- Language: Classical Chinese
- Subject: History of the Sixteen Kingdoms
- Publication date: early 6th century
- Publication place: Northern Wei

The Spring and Autumn Annals of the Sixteen Kingdoms, also known by its Chinese title Shiliuguo Chunqiu (simplified Chinese: 十六国春秋; traditional Chinese: 十六國春秋; pinyin: Shíliùguó Chūnqiū; Wade–Giles: Shihliukuo Ch'unch'iu) is a Chinese biographical historical work of the Sixteen Kingdoms compiled by the Northern Wei official Cui Hong (Note: Not to be confused with the father of Cui Hao, who has a similar-sounding name. The author of Shiliuguo Chunqiu has a biography in vol.67 of Book of Wei, and his courtesy name was Yanluan (彦鸾).) between 501 and 522. It became one of the chief sources for the compilation of the Book of Wei and Book of Jin.

Parts of the book went missing from the early Tang dynasty and did not survive intact. (Note: Per vol.33 of Book of Sui, the Annals were still intact when the Book of Sui was compiled.) It originally contained 100 volumes, a preface and a chronological table. (Note: Vol.46 of Old Book of Tang and vol.58 of New Book of Tang both recorded that the Annals consisted of 120 volumes.) By the time of the early Song dynasty, many of them were lost and only about 20 volumes remained, which were quoted extensively by Sima Guang, compiler of the Zizhi Tongjian. (Note: The biographies of the monarchs of the Sixteen Kingdoms were also cited in vols.119 to 127 of Taiping Yulan.) There are two extant versions dating from the late Ming dynasty, the edition by Tu Qiaosun containing 100 volumes, and the one by He Tang containing 16 volumes, reprinted in the Hanwei Congshu, a compilation of histories. Tu's edition was published for the third time in 1781. Also there is a 100 volumes edition together with a chronological table from the mid-Qing dynasty by Tang Qiu, taken from the edition by He Tang and from other materials.
