= Zhang Chonghua =

Zhang Chonghua 張重華
- Duke of Xiping

Ruler of Former Liang
- Reign: 346–353
- Predecessor: Zhang Jun
- Successor: Zhang Yaoling
- Born: 327
- Died: 353 (aged 25–26)
- Spouse: Princess Pei (wife), Lady Guo (concubine)
- Issue: Zhang Yaoling, Zhang Xuanjing
Names
- Zhang Chonghua (張重華)
Era name and dates
- Jiànxīng (建興) (Note: Used the era name of the Emperor Min of Jin.): 346–353
Regnal name
- 346–347; Given tally, Grand Commander, Grand Commandant, Colonel to Guard the Qiang people, Governor of Liang Province, Duke of Xiping, Acting Prince of Liang (使持節 大都督 太尉 護羌校尉 涼州牧 西平公 假涼王) 347–353; Temporary given tally, Grand Preceptor, Grand Commander, Commander in charge of military affairs in Longyou and Guanzhong, Grand General, Inspector of Liang Province, Duke of Xiping (假節 侍中 大都督 督隴右關中諸軍事 護羌校尉 大將軍 涼州刺史 西平公); Since 353 Temporary given tally, Grand Preceptor, Grand Commander, Commander in charge of military affairs in Longyou and Guanzhong, Grand General, Governor of Liang Province, Duke of Xiping (假節 侍中 大都督 督隴右關中諸軍事 護羌校尉 大將軍 涼州牧 西平公)
Posthumous name
- Duke Jinglie (敬烈公, honored by Eastern Jin); Prince Huan (桓王, honored by Zhang Zuo)
Temple name
- Shizong (世宗, honored by Zhang Zuo)
- Dynasty: Former Liang
- Father: Zhang Jun
- Mother: Lady Ma

Zhang Chonghua (Chinese: 張重華; 327–353), courtesy name Tailin (泰臨), formally Duke Jinglie of Xiping (西平敬烈公, posthumous name given by the Jin dynasty) or Duke Huan of Xiping (西平桓公, posthumous name used internally in Former Liang) was a ruler of the Chinese state Former Liang. During his reign, he often not only used the Jin-created title Duke of Xiping, but also used the title "Acting Prince of Liang" (假涼王). During the brief reign of his older brother Zhang Zuo, he was honored as Prince Huan of Liang (涼桓王).

== Early life ==
In 327, Zhang was born. Zhang's father was Zhang Jun (Duke Zhongcheng), who had become the ruler of Former Liang in 324. Zhang's mother was Lady Ma, a concubine of Zhang Jun. Zhang's elder half-brother was Zhang Zuo, whose mother was not Princess Yan.

In 333, at age six, Zhang became the heir apparent of Zhang Jun. It unclear why he was made heir apparent.

In 339, at age 12, Zhang received some authority and the title of acting governor of Liang Province (涼州, modern central and western Gansu). In early 346, when Zhang's father divided his domain into three provinces, he became the governor of Liang Province.

In 346, Zhang's father died. At about age 19, Zhang succeeded his father, and inherited titles he had—including the Duke of Xiping and the self-declared title Acting Prince of Liang. Zhang honored his father's wife Princess Yan as Grand Princess Dowager and his mother Lady Ma as Princess Dowager.

== Reign ==
Zhang appeared to be a mediocre ruler, as he was criticized for spending too much time in games and pleasure. He also tended to trust flattering attendants, even though he was not criticized for being cruel or extravagant. In 349, Suo Zhen (索振) tried to persuade him to spend less time on games and not to reward his attendants with too much money, but while Zhang Chonghua thanked him and rewarded him, he did not appear to change his ways significantly.

Soon after Zhang Chonghua succeeded his father, Later Zhao forces, under the generals Wang Zhuo (王擢) and Ma Qiu, made a surprise attack against Former Liang, seizing Former Liang's territory south of the Yellow River, including the important city of Jincheng (金城, in modern Lanzhou, Gansu). Zhang Chonghua commissioned Xie Ai to lead his army, and Xie was able to defeat Ma and Wang's forces in 346 and again in 347, forcing them to retreat from their original plans to destroy Former Liang, but the land south of the Yellow River could not be recovered.

Also in 347, the Jin emissary Yu Gui (俞歸) arrived in Former Liang to confer Zhang Chonghua a number of offices—but not the one that Zhang Chonghua was looking for, Prince of Liang. He tried to persuade Yu to grant him that title, but Yu would not, and so he detained Yu (who would not be released until 363, long after Zhang Chonghua's death).

Zhang appeared to have largely stood by as Later Zhao collapsed during 349 to 351. Most of the western territory of Later Zhao fell into the hands of the Di general Fu Jiàn, who established Former Qin in 351. In late 352 or early 353, the ex-Later Zhao general Wang Zhuo, who had been holding parts of modern eastern Gansu and who had declared loyalty to Former Yan, could not resist Former Qin forces and surrendered to Zhang Chonghua, who treated him well, intending to use him as a general against Former Qin. In spring 353, he commissioned Wang, Zhang Hong (張弘), and Song Xiu (宋修) to lead 15,000 men against Former Qin, but suffered a great loss—reportedly 12,000, or 80% of the army. Zhang and Song were captured, while Wang fled back to the capital Guzang (姑臧, in modern Wuwei, Gansu). In summer, however, Wang led 20,000 men and attacked Shanggui (上邽, in modern Tianshui, Gansu), capturing most of Qin Province (秦州, modern eastern Gansu). Zhang Chonghua then submitted a petition to Emperor Mu of Jin, requesting a campaign against Former Qin. Emperor Mu sent messengers to praise and bestow more honors on Zhang Chonghua, but the Jin government did not appear to be interested in attacking Former Qin at the time, so the plan was not carried out.

Later that year, Zhang grew ill, and he designated his nine-year-old son Zhang Yaoling to be his heir apparent. His older brother Zhang Zuo the Marquess of Changning plotted with Zhang Chonghua's attendants Zhao Zhang (趙長) and Wei Qi (尉緝) to take over power, and Zhao and Wei falsely accused Xie Ai of crimes and had him exiled from the capital to be the governor of Jiuquan Commandery (酒泉, roughly modern Jiuquan, Gansu). Xie submitted a petition accusing Zhang Zuo and Zhao of plotting, and in winter of that year, when Zhang Chonghua grew gravely ill, he tried to summon Xie back to the capital to serve as Zhang Yaoling's regent, but the order was seized by Zhang Zuo and Zhao and never announced.

== Era name ==
Most historical sources indicate that Zhang, like his grandfather Zhang Shi, his granduncle Zhang Mao, and his father Zhang Jun, continued to use Emperor Min of Jin's era name Jianxing (both to show continued allegiance to Jin and to distance himself from Emperor Yuan of Jin and his line) but some sources indicate that he changed era name to Yongle (永樂 yǒng lè 346–353). A current theory is that his era name was used internally while the Jianxing era name was used when communicating with other states. After Zhang's death, Zhang Zuo became regent, and in early 354 usurped the title from Zhang Yaoling.

== Personal ==
Zhang's wife was Princess Pei. Zhang's major concubine was Lady Guo, likely mother of Zhang Xuanjing. Zhang's children are Zhang Yaoling (Duke Ai) and Zhang Xuanjing, Duke Jingdao.

In 353, Zhang's wife was executed by Zhang Zuo. In 353 Zhang died after a period of illness. Zhang was succeeded by Zhang Yaoling, under the title Duke of Xiping.

== Notes ==
Prince Huan of (Former) Liang House of Zhang Born: 327 Died: 353
Chinese royalty
Preceded by Zhang Jun	Prince of Former Liang; 346–353	Vacant Title next held by Zhang Zuo
Chinese nobility
Preceded by Zhang Jun	Duke of Xiping; 346–353	Succeeded by Zhang Yaoling
