= 360s =

Decade

The 360s decade ran from January 1, 360, to December 31, 369.

== Events ==
=== By place ===
==== Roman Empire ====
- February – Julian, Roman Caesar, is proclaimed emperor in Lutetia (modern Paris).
- The Alamanni raid Raetia (Switzerland), but are pushed back behind the Rhine by Julian, into the Black Forest.
- King Shapur II continues his campaign against the Roman fortresses, capturing Singara, Bezabde and Nisibis.
- Emperor Constantius II and Julian exchange several letters, both hoping to avoid a civil war.

==== Europe ====
- The Huns invade the Pontic steppes by the thousands, spreading terror as they take over territories held for generations by Alans, Heruls, Ostrogoths and Visigoths.

=== By topic ===
==== Agriculture ====
- Roman authorities in Britain export wheat to supply the legions on the Rhine; they have encouraged production of wheat for that purpose.

==== Religion ====
- 14 February – The first Hagia Sophia church is consecrated in Constantinople.
- Council of Constantinople (360): Emperor Constantius II requests a church council, at Constantinople; both the eastern and western bishops attend the meeting. Ulfilas also attends the council and endorses the resulting creed. After the council several homoiousian bishops are deposed or banished, including Macedonius I of Constantinople and Cyril of Jerusalem.
- At about this date, Ligugé Abbey in France is founded for the monastic Order of Saint Benedict by Martin of Tours, under dispensation from Bishop Hilary of Poitiers.

=== By place ===
==== Roman Empire ====
- July – Julian begins leading his troops eastwards against Constantius II.
- November 3 – Emperor Constantius II dies of a fever at Mopsuestia in Cilicia, age 44; on his deathbed he is baptised, and declares his cousin Julian rightful successor.
- December 11 – Julian becomes sole emperor of the Roman Empire; he rules from Constantinople, and tries to restore paganism. Constantius II is buried in the Church of the Holy Apostles.
- Ministers and followers of Constantius II are put on trial, at the Chalcedon Tribunal.

==== China ====
- July 10 – Sixteen Kingdoms: Jin Aidi, age 20, succeeds Jin Mudi, as emperor of the Eastern Jin Dynasty.

=== By topic ===
==== Art ====
- 361–363 – A Julian the Apostate coin is issued. It is now kept at the British Museum, London.

==== Medicine ====
- Constantinople enforces a strict licensing system for physicians.

==== Religion ====
- Emperor Julian tries to organize a pagan church and substitute it for Christianity. Pope Liberius repudiates the Arian creed, and declares that the Council of Ariminum has no authority to issue decrees.
- Gregory Nazianzus (Saint Gregory the Theologian) returns to Nazianzus and is appointed a priest by his father, who wants him to assist local Christians.
- Construction of the Monastery of Saint Anthony in the Eastern Desert of Egypt begins.
- December 24 – George of Cappadocia, the Arian intruding bishop of Alexandria, is murdered in his see and Athanasius of Alexandria returns to his native city in triumph.

=== By place ===
==== Roman Empire ====
- July 18 – Emperor Julian arrives at Antioch with an expeditionary force (60,000 men), and stays there for nine months, to launch a campaign against the Persian Empire. He secures the co-operation of King Arsaces of Armenia, who fights a bloody guerrilla war against the Persians.
- Julian builds a fleet of 50 warships, and more than 1,000 transport boats at Samosata, for his expedition in Persia against King Shapur II the Great.
- An earthquake strikes Nicaea (Turkey).
- An earthquake strikes Al-Karak (Jordan).

=== By topic ===
==== Religion ====
- February 21 – Athanasius returns to Alexandria and convenes a council, at which he appeals for unity among Christians who differ in terminology, but Emperor Julian orders Athanasius to leave Alexandria. He will remain in exile in Upper Egypt, until after Julian's death the next year.
- October 22 – The temple of Apollo at Daphne, outside Antioch, is destroyed in a mysterious fire.

=== By place ===
==== Roman Empire ====
- March 5 – Emperor Julian departs from Antioch with his army (90,000 men) and heads north towards the Euphrates. En route he creates a diversion and sends a force of 30,000 soldiers under his cousin Procopius to Armenia.
- April – Julian crosses the Euphrates near Hierapolis, using 50 pontoon ships, and moves eastwards to Carrhae. He destroys Perisapora and overruns Persian forts along the desert frontier (Limes Arabicus).
- May 29 – Battle of Ctesiphon: Julian reaches the vicinity of the strongly fortified capital Ctesiphon. King Shapur II in charge of a large Persian army adopts a scorched earth policy, leaving the Romans desperately short of supplies.
- June 16 – The Roman army starts its retreat northward to Corduene (Armenia). Julian marches back up the Tigris and burns his fleet of supply ships. During the withdrawal Julian's forces suffer several attacks from the Persians.
- June 26 – Battle of Samarra: Julian is mortally wounded in a skirmish and dies from a wound received during the fighting near Samarra (Iraq). Jovian, general of the Guard, succeeds him and is proclaimed Emperor by the troops.
- Emperor Jovian negotiates a disastrous peace with Persia, surrendering four of the five Roman provinces gained by Caesar Galerius in 298, and the cities Nisibis and Singara (Mesopotamia).

==== Egypt ====
- Egyptian rose in revolt against Roman occupation, armed clashes occur.

==== Europe ====
- The Huns first appear in Europe and reach the Caspian Sea.

==== Middle East ====
- May 18–19 – Galilee earthquake of 363. Petra, capital of the Nabataeans (in modern-day Jordan), is seriously damaged.
- 363 Arsakawan earthquake: It affects the cities of Arsakawan (modern Doğubayazıt) and Salat (modern Sisian).

=== By topic ===
==== Astronomy ====
- April 20 – The planet Venus occults the planet Jupiter.

==== Religion ====
- The Council of Laodicea, which deals with constricting the conduct of church members, is held. The major canon approved by this council is Canon 29, which prohibits resting on the Sabbath (Saturday), restricting Christians to honoring the Lord on Sunday.
- Mar Mattai Monastery is founded on Mount Alfaf.

=== By place ===
==== Roman Empire ====
- February 17 – Emperor Jovian dies after a reign of eight months. He is found dead in his tent at Tyana (Asia Minor) en route back to Constantinople, in suspicious circumstances.
- February 26 – Valentinian I is proclaimed Emperor by officers of the Roman army at Nicaea in Bithynia. He addresses the soldiers (who threaten to riot) in a speech. He founds the Valentinianic dynasty and rules the Western portion of the Roman Empire, from Caledonia (Scotland) to the Rhine frontier, ensuring it a few years of relative security. He settles in Lutetia (Paris) and establishes a militia to defend the region.
- March 28 – Valens, brother of Valentinian I, is appointed co-emperor (Augustus) in the palace of Hebdomon (Turkey). He rules the Eastern portion of the Roman Empire, from the Danube to the Persian border, and begins the first anti-pagan persecutions.
- Britain is forced to endure fierce barbarian raids.

=== By topic ===
==== Religion ====
- The Council of Laodicea decides some disciplinary questions of the church and attempts to establish the Biblical canon, but fails.

==== Science ====
- Theon of Alexandria, Greek mathematician, observes a solar eclipse (June 16) and a lunar eclipse (November 25).

=== By place ===
==== Roman Empire ====
- July 21 – An earthquake and tsunami devastate Crete and Alexandria and affects Italy, Greece, and Palestine.
- September 28 – Procopius revolts and bribes two legions passing by Constantinople. He proclaims himself Emperor, and takes control of Thrace and Bithynia.
- November 1 – The Alamanni cross the Rhine and invade Gaul. Emperor Valentinian I moves to Paris to command the army and defend the Gallic cities.

==== China ====
- March 30 – Sixteen Kingdoms: Jin Feidi, age 23, succeeds his brother Jin Aidi as emperor of the Eastern Jin Dynasty. He has no actual power; governmental matters are largely in the hands of his granduncle Sima Yu.

=== By topic ===
==== Religion ====
- Basil of Caesarea becomes presbyter of Caesarea.
- Emperor Valens orders the expulsion of the Alexandrian bishop Athanasius from his see, but instead of going into exile Athanasius, now about 67, moves to the outskirts of Alexandria.
- Antipope Felix II dies after a 9-year reign, ending the double occupancy of the papacy.

=== By place ===
==== Roman Empire ====
- January 2 – The Alamanni cross the frozen Rhine in large numbers, and invade the Gallic provinces. They capture Alsace and a large part of the Swiss Plateau.
- April – Battle of Thyatira: Emperor Valens defeats the troops of Procopius, bringing an end to his revolt; Serenianus and Marcellus are killed. Procopius flees the battlefield, but is executed by Valens.
- Valens builds a pontoon bridge across the Danube, and drives the Visigoths further north, where they will come under pressure from the advancing Huns.
- Winter – Emperor Valentinian I appoints Jovinus, his Master of the Horse (Magister Equitum), general of the army. He defeats the Alamanni in three successive battles, and pushes them out of Gaul.

=== By topic ===
==== Art and Science ====
- The Tabula Peutingeriana, a map showing Roman possessions and roads, is created about this time.

==== Religion ====
- January 31 – Athanasius of Alexandria returns from his fifth exile. He has spent four months in his ancestral tomb outside Alexandria.
- Buddhist monk Lè Zūn has a vision of "golden rays of light shining down on 1,000 Buddhas", resulting in the creation of the Mogao Caves.
- October 1 – Pope Liberius dies after a 14-year reign and is succeeded by Damasus I as 37th pope. Romans unhappy with this choice elect the antipope Ursicinus.

=== By place ===
==== Roman Empire ====
- Battle of Solicinium: Emperor Valentinian I launches a punitive expedition against the Alamanni, due to the crises in Britannia and Gaul. The Alamanni re-cross the Rhine and plunder Moguntiacum (modern Mainz).
- Valentinian I declares that Christians will not be forced into gladiator training schools.
- Great Conspiracy: The Roman garrison on Hadrian's Wall revolts and allows Picts from Caledonia to devastate Britain. Simultaneously Attacotti, the Scotti from Hibernia (Ireland), and the Saxons from Germania invade the island's mid-western and south-eastern borders. They sack the cities and murder, rape or enslave Romano-British civilians.
- Eunomius of Cyzicus is banished to Mauretania for harbouring the usurper Procopius.
- August 4 – Gratian receives the title of Augustus under his father, Valentinian I.
- Winter – Valentinian I mobilises a massive army for his campaign against the Alamanni and the Franks. He summons the Italian and Illyrian legions for a spring offensive.

==== Asia ====
- The first Korean envoy arrives in Japan, emissary of the government of Kudara.

=== By topic ===
==== Religion ====
- The first Listing of the New Testament (Bible) is made by St. Athanasius of Alexandria.
- November 16 – Antipope Ursicinus is banished by the praefecti to Gaul.
- Epiphanius of Salamis becomes bishop of Salamis, Cyprus.
- Emperor Valens is baptized by Eudoxius of Antioch.

==== Science ====
- In the region of the constellation Perseus, a star not visible to the naked eye, and 1,533 light years distant from Earth, explodes in a nova. The light from the star, now called GK Persei, was first detected on Earth on February 21, 1901.

=== By place ===
==== Roman Empire ====
- Spring – Emperor Valentinian I and his 8-year-old son, Gratian, cross the Rhine with an army into Alamannic territory. He defeats the Alemanni and burns food stores along the border. A temporary peace is signed with Macrian, king of the Bucinobantes, and Valentinian returns to his capital Augusta Treverorum (modern Trier).
- Great Conspiracy: Picts, Scotti and Saxons reach Roman London and plunder the city. Theodosius, a general (Comes Britanniarum), is sent with a relief force to Britannia. He marches from Richborough, Kent, to deal with the invaders.
- Winter – The barbarians are driven back to their homelands, Hadrian's Wall is retaken and order returns to the Roman diocese. Theodosius reorganises the abandoned forts and mounts punitive expeditions in Hibernia (Ireland).

==== Asia ====
- 11 October – An earthquake strikes Nicaea (modern Turkey).

=== By place ===
==== Roman Empire ====
- Spring – Emperor Valens crosses the Danube, and attacks the Gothic tribes (Greuthungi and Tervingi). Valens and Athanaric, the Gothic king, eventually sign a treaty.
- Fritigern becomes king of the Visigoths; amidst hostilities with his rival Athanaric, he asks Valens and the Thracian field army to intervene. They end the civil war, and Fritigern converts to Christianity.
- Theodosius the Elder brings Britain fully back to the Empire after the Great Conspiracy of 367.

==== Persia ====
- King Shapur II occupies the pro-Roman kingdom of Armenia. He besieges Artogerassa in modern Georgia, where Papas (Pap), son of King Arsaces II (Arshak II), defends the fortress and the royal treasure against Persian forces.

==== Asia ====
- Eastern Jin general Huan Wen's third northern expedition is defeated by Former Yan general Murong Chui.
- Goguryeo invades Baekje (approximate date).

=== By topic ===
==== Art and Science ====
- Wulfila creates a Gothic alphabet composed of letters based on Greek and Roman letters, as well as some Germanic runes. He converts the Goths to Arian Christianity.

== Births ==
360

- John Cassian, Desert Father and Christian saint (approximate date)
- Saint Mesrob, Armenian monk and theologian (approximate date)
- Saint Ninian, missionary to Scotland (approximate date)
- Tao Sheng, Chinese Buddhist scholar (approximate date)
- Wang Fahui, empress during the Jin Dynasty (d. 380)

362

- Flavia Maxima Constantia, daughter of Constantius II (approximate date)
- Mesrop Mashtots, Armenian linguist (d. 440)
- Jin Xiaowudi, emperor of the Eastern Jin Dynasty (d. 396)

363

- Sulpicius Severus, Christian writer (approximate date)
- Wu Di (or Liu Yu), Chinese emperor of Liu Song (d. 422)

364

- Blaesilla, Roman noblewoman (d. 384)
- Huiguo, Chinese Buddhist nun (d. 433)
- Sima Daozi, Chinese prince and regent (d. 403)
- Xu Xianzhi, Chinese official and regent (d. 426)

365

- Julius Agricola, Roman consul and praetorian prefect
- Kou Qianzhi, Chinese high official and taoist (d. 448)
- Tao Yuanming, Chinese poet and politician (d. 427)
- Tufa Rutan, Chinese prince of the Southern Liang (d. 415)

366

- January 18 – Valentinianus Galates, Roman emperor (d. 370)
- Yao Xing, Chinese emperor of the Later Qin Dynasty (d. 416)

368

- Eustochium, Christian Desert Mother and saint (approximate date)
- Juqu Mengxun, Chinese prince of the Northern Liang (d. 433)
- Philostorgius, Anomoean church historian and writer (d. 439)

369

- Huan Xuan, Chinese warlord and emperor of the Jin Dynasty (d. 404)

== Deaths ==
360

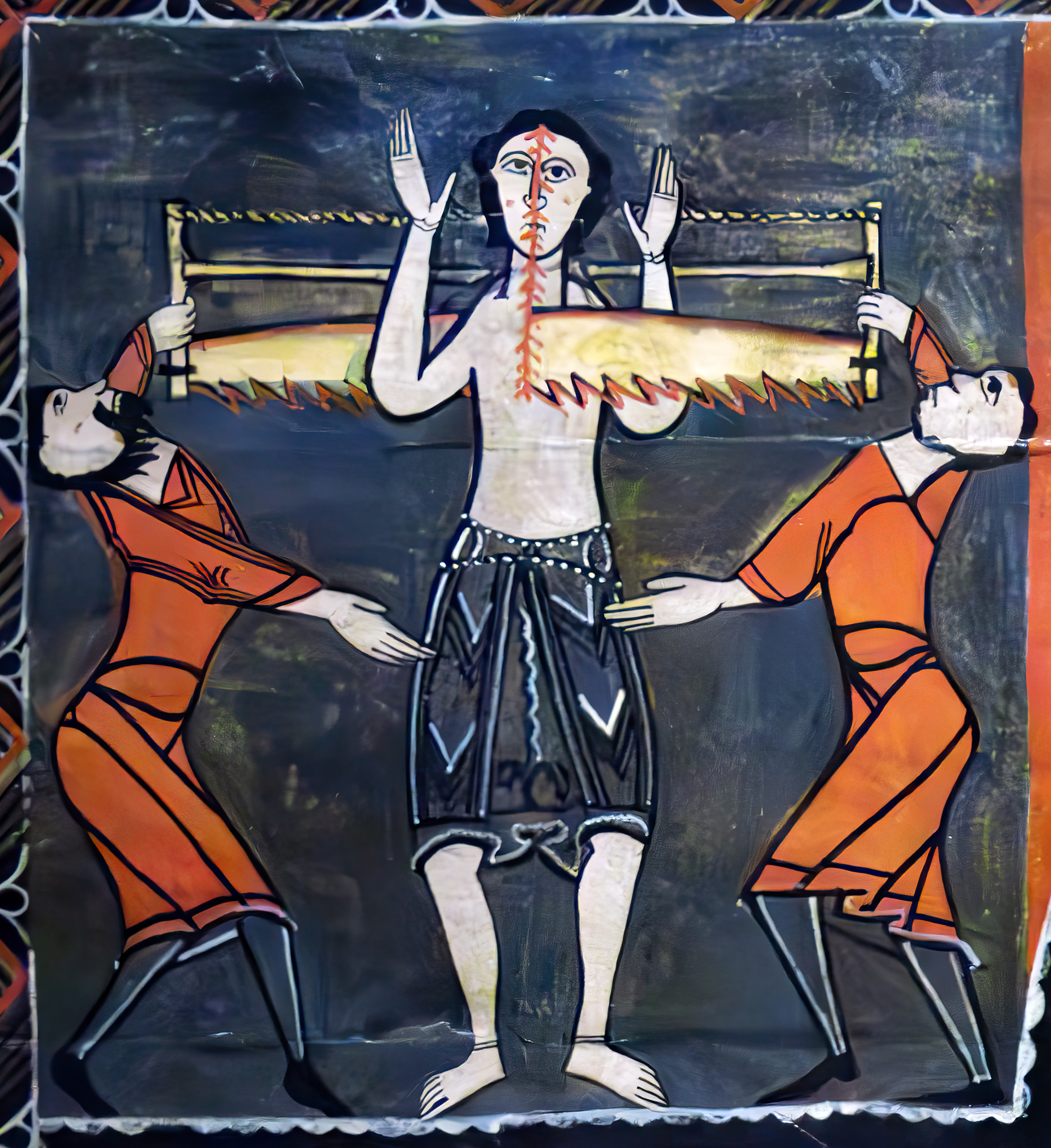
Saint Judas Cyriacus

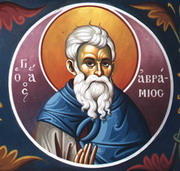
Saint Abramios the Recluse

- May 4 – Judas Cyriacus, Roman Catholic priest and saint
- October 14 – Gaudentius of Rimini, Roman Catholic priest and saint
- November 11 – Abramios the Recluse, Byzantine Orthodox priest and saint
- December 18 – Auxentius of Mopsuestia, Byzantine Orthodox priest and saint

=== Date unknown ===
- Eusebius of Emesa, Byzantine Orthodox bishop and saint (b. 290)
- Murong Jun, emperor of the Former Yan (b. 319)

361

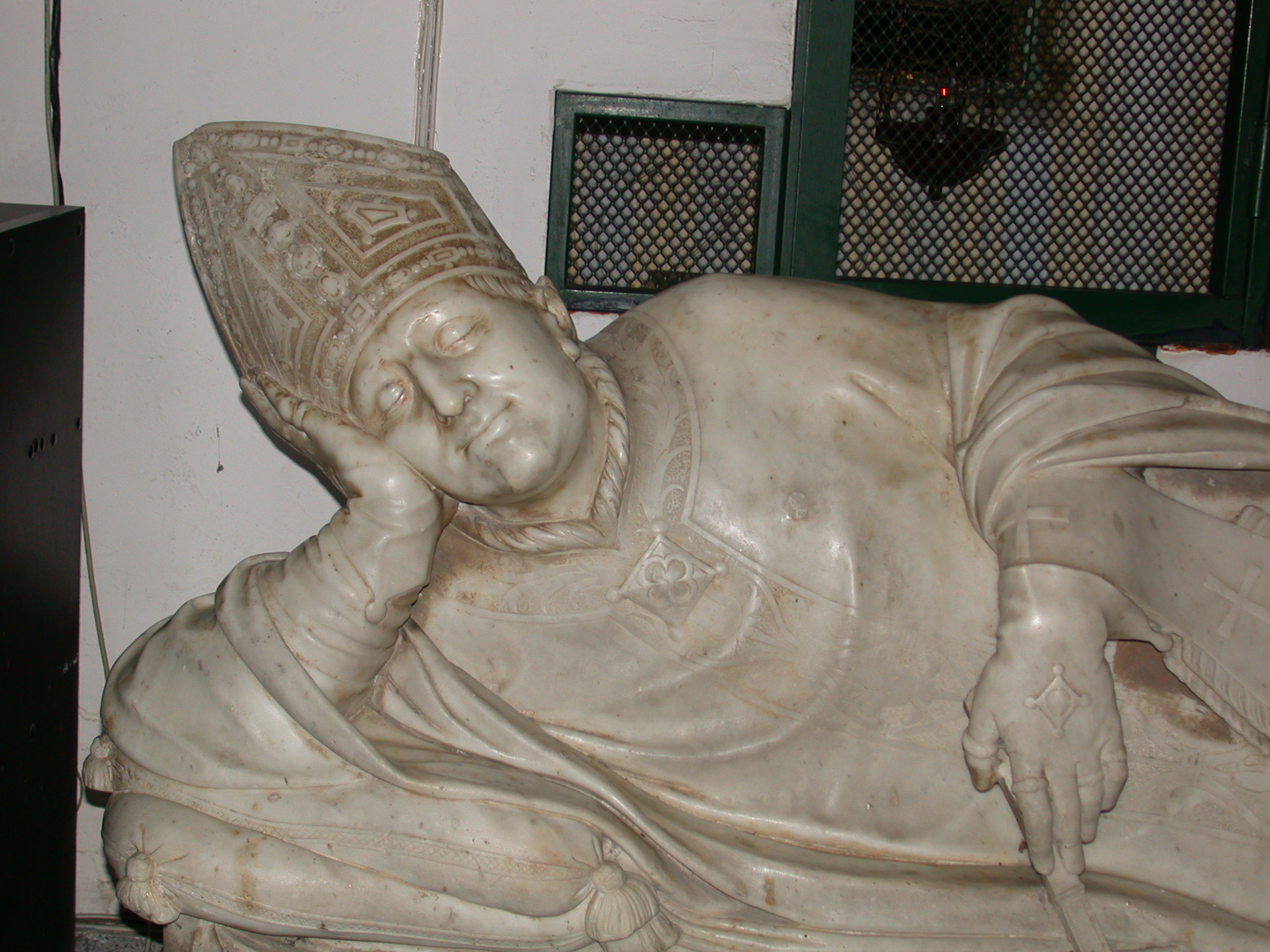
Saint Maximus of Naples

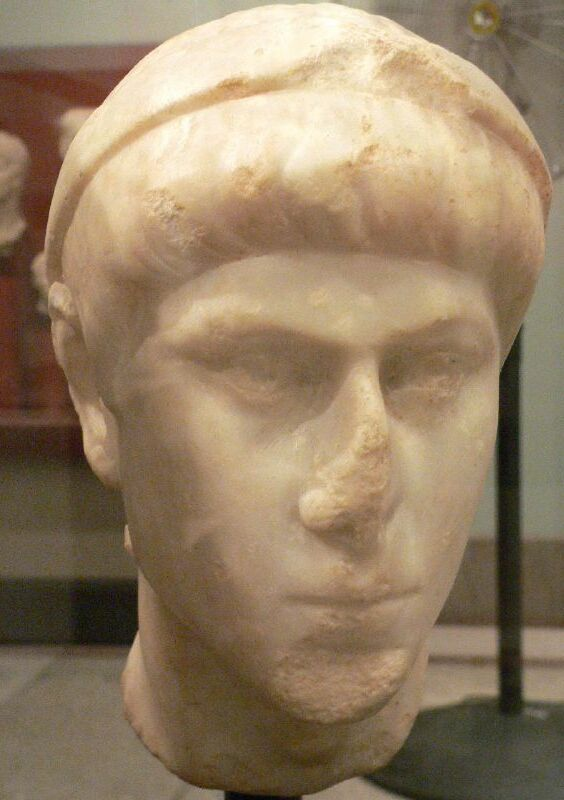
Emperor Constantius II

- November – Constantius II, Roman Emperor (b. 317)
- December 24
  - George of Cappadocia, Byzantine Orthodox archbishop and saint
  - George of Laodicea, Byzantine Orthodox archbishop and saint

=== Date unknown ===
- Apodemius, Roman officer and secret agent
- Eusebius, Roman officer
- Jin Mudi, emperor of the Eastern Jin Dynasty (b. 343)
- Li Shi, emperor of the Chinese Ba-Di state Cheng Han
- Maximus of Naples, Roman Catholic archbishop and saint
- Song Hun, regent of the Chinese state Former Liang
- Wang Xizhi, Chinese calligrapher (b. 303)
- Zhu Jingjian, Chinese Buddhist nun (b. 292)

362

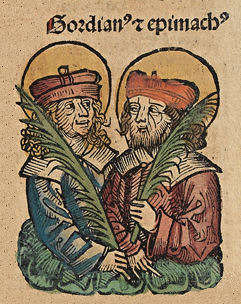
Saints Gordianus and Epimachus

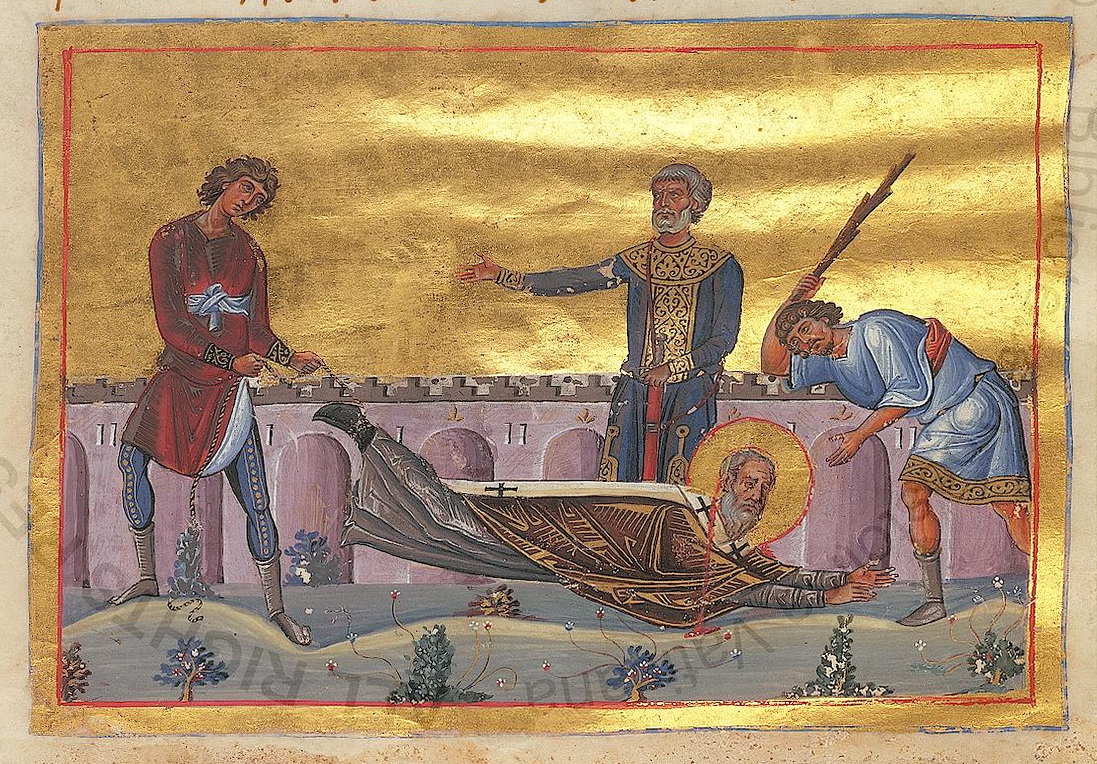
Saint Dorotheus of Tyre

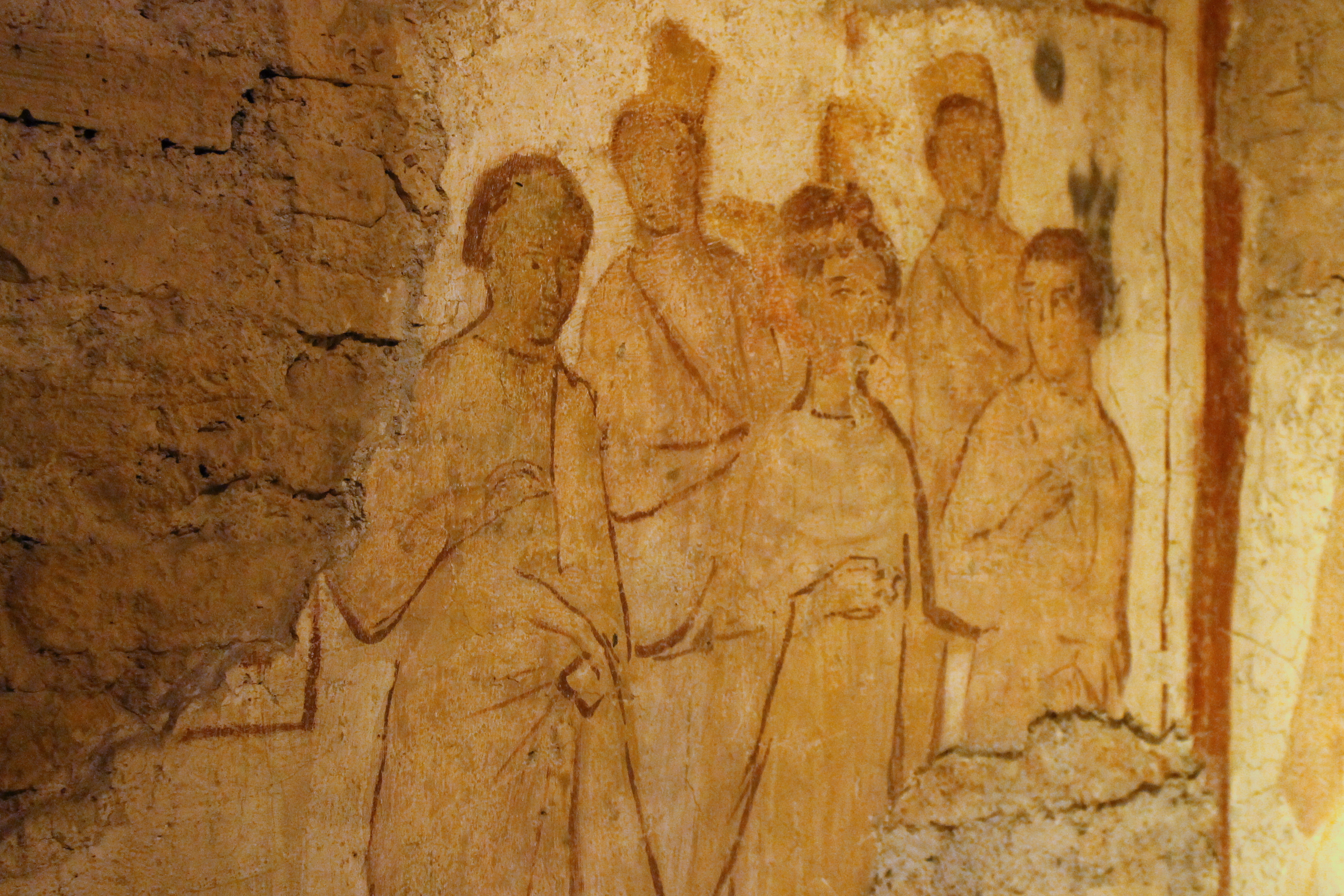
Saint Crispus, Crispinianus, and Benedicta

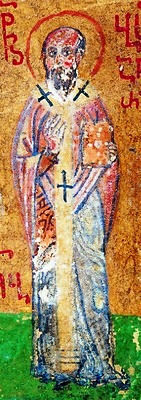
Saint Basil of Ancyra

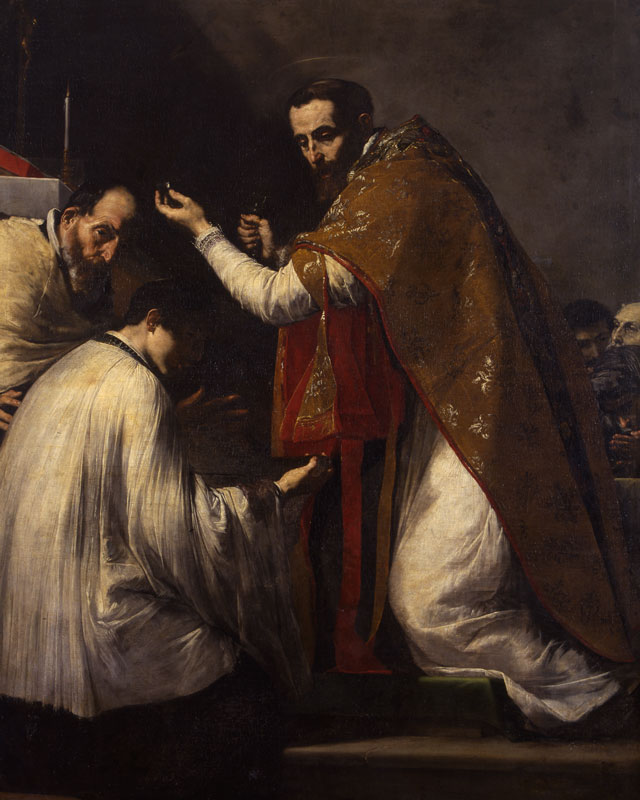
Saint Donatus of Arezzo

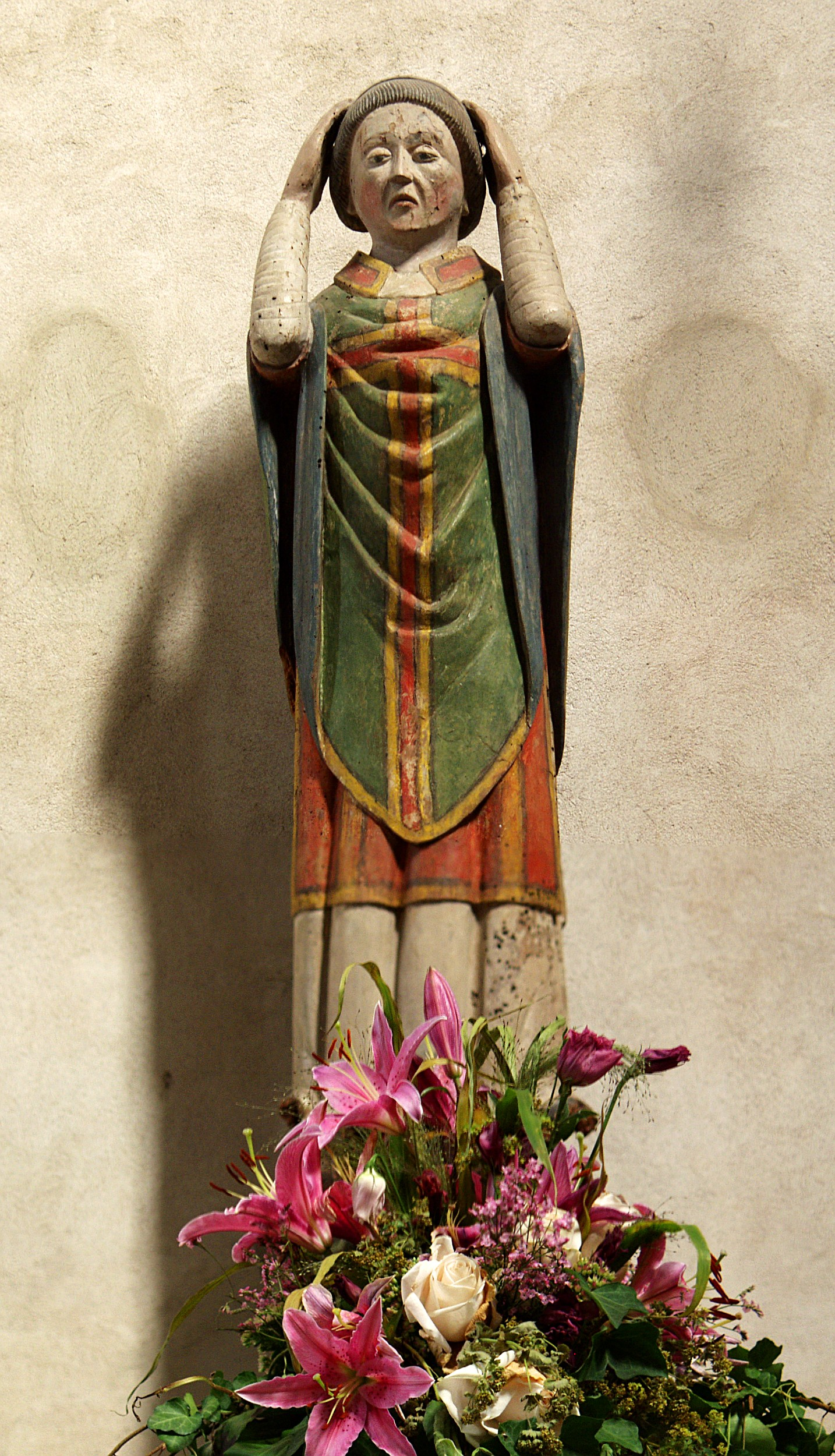
Saint Eliphius

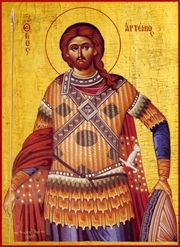
Saint Artemis

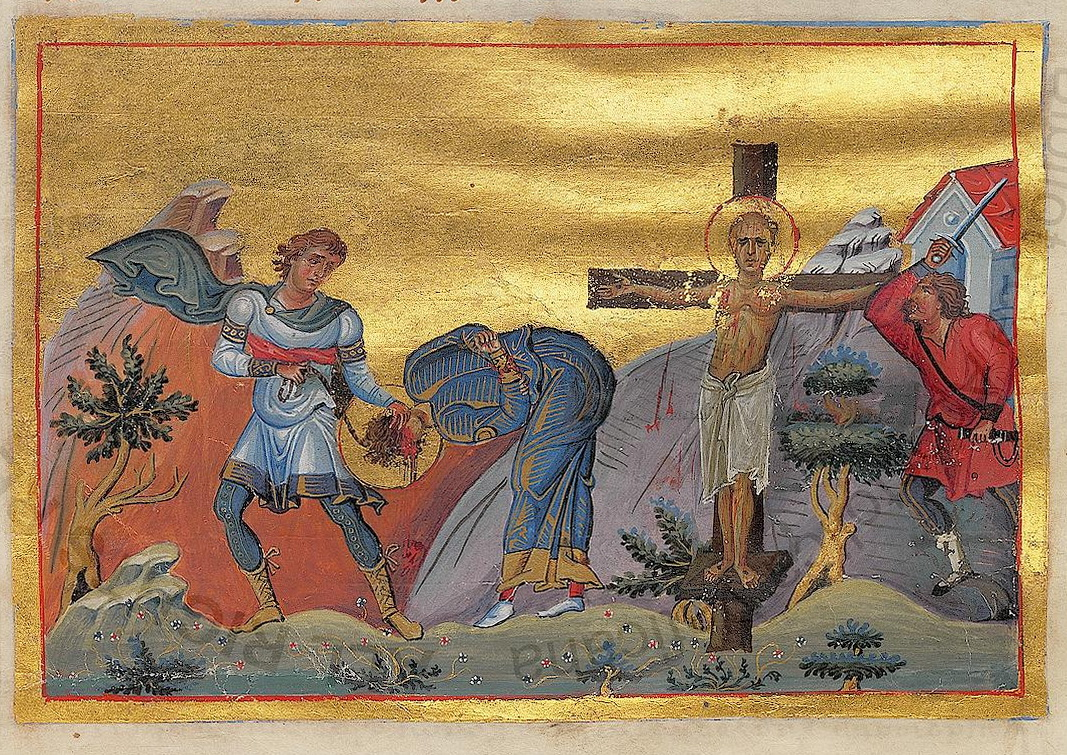
Saint Gemellus of Ancyra

- January 1 – Paulus Catena, Roman politician
- February 25 – Reginos, Greek Orthodox bishop and saint
- May 10 – Gordianus and Epimachus, Roman Catholic priests, martyrs and saints
- June 5 – Dorotheus of Tyre, Roman Catholic bishop and martyr (b. 255)
- June 27 – Crispus, Crispinianus, and Benedicta, Roman Catholic, priests, martyrs and saints
- June 28 – Basil of Ancyra, Byzantine Orthodox bishop and saint
- August 5 – Eusignius of Antioch, Byzantine Orthodox bishop and martyr (b. 252)
- August 7 – Donatus of Arezzo, Roman Catholic bishop and saint
- October 16 – Eliphius, Roman Catholic priest and saint
- October 20
  - Artemius, Egyptian Orthodox martyr and saint
  - Theodoret of Antioch, Syrian Christian priest and martyr
- December 10 – Gemellus of Ancyra, Byzantine Orthodox bishop and saint

=== Date unknown ===
- Princess Dowager Ma, concubine of Zhang Jun

363

- June 26 – Julian the Apostate, Roman emperor (b. 331)
- Aemilia Hilaria, Galo-Roman physician and writer (b. 300)
- Lucillianus, Roman commander (magister equitum)
- Zhang Xuanjing, Chinese ruler of Former Liang (b. 350)
- Zhou (or Cheng), Chinese concubine of Jin Chengdi

364

- February 17 – Jovian, Roman emperor (b. 331)
- Ge Hong, Chinese scholar and taoist (b. 283)
- Theophilos the Indian, Christian bishop

365

- March 30 – Ai of Jin (or Qianling), Chinese emperor (b. 341)
- November 22 – Felix II, antipope of Rome (b. 287)
- Feng Yi (or Zizhuan), Chinese official and general
- Sima Xun (or Weichang), Chinese warlord (b. 306)
- Wang Muzhi, Chinese empress of the Jin Dynasty

366

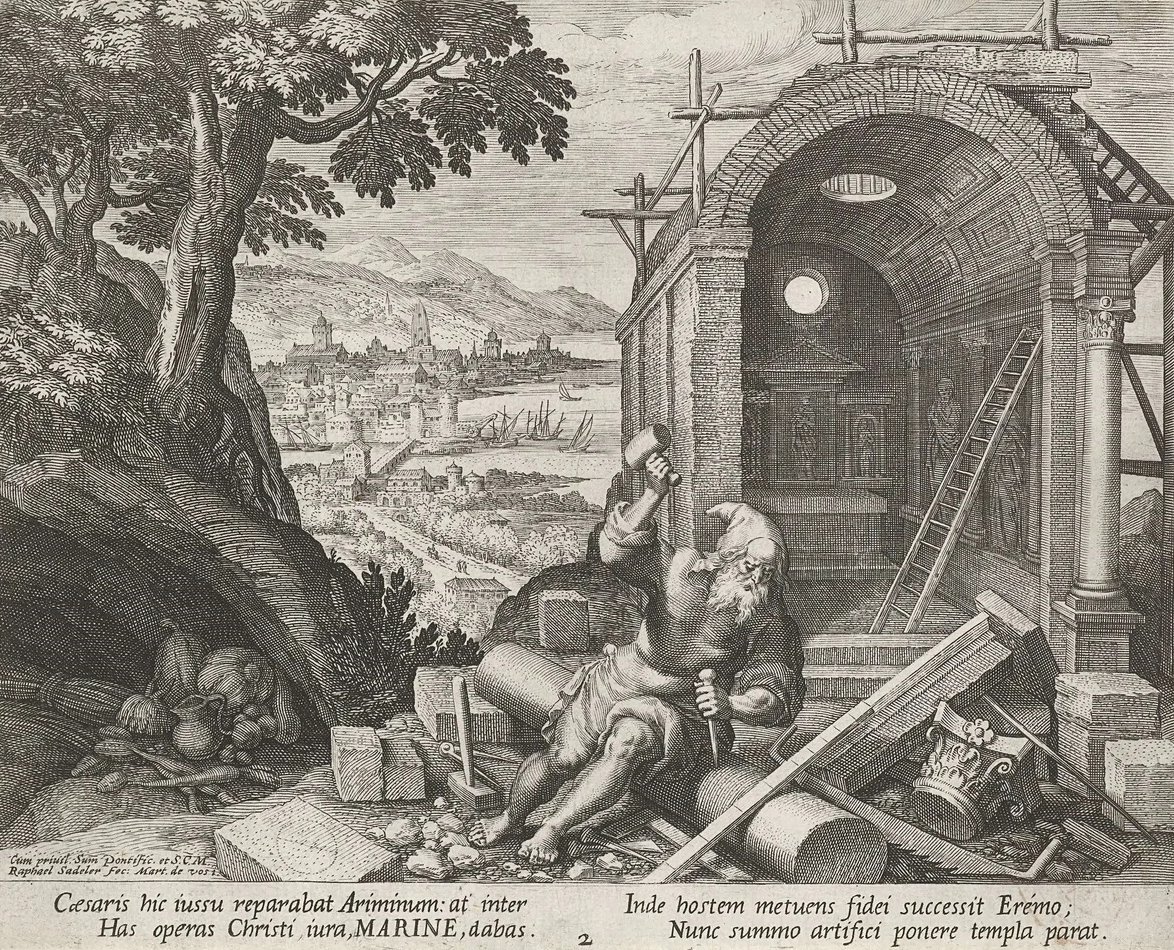
Saint Marinus

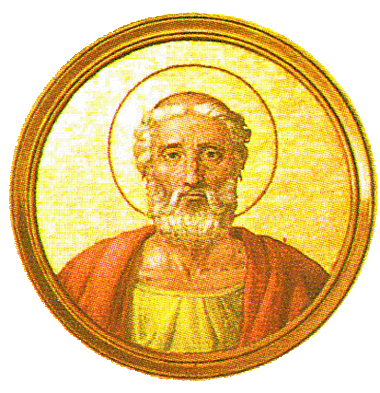
Pope Liberius

- May 16 – Ajabel, Christian priest and martyr
- May 27 – Procopius, Roman general and usurper
- August 1 – Leo of Montefeltro, Christian bishop and saint
- September 24 – Liberius, pope of the Catholic Church (b. 310)

=== Date unknown ===
- Acacius of Caesarea, Christian bishop
- Marcellus, Roman general and usurper
- Marinus, Christian hermit and saint (b. 275)
- Serenianus, Roman general of the Imperial Guard
- Yu Daolian, Chinese empress and wife of Jin Feidi
- Zhi Dun, Chinese Buddhist monk and philosopher (b. 314)

367

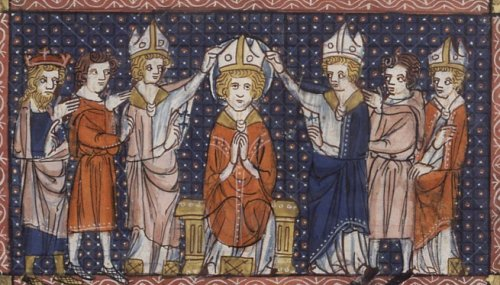
Saint Hilary of Poitiers

- January 13 – Hilary of Poitiers, Byzantine bishop, Doctor of the Church and saint (b. c. 315)

=== Date unknown ===
- Murong Ke, Chinese general and statesman of Former Yan
- Yang Wu (or Shiqiu), Chinese official, general and regent

368

- July 7 – Maternien, Christian bishop and saint

=== Date unknown ===
- Caesarius of Nazianzus, Roman physician and politician
- Vulcacius Rufinus, Roman prefect, consul and politician
- Yue Wan, Chinese general and politician of Former Yan

369

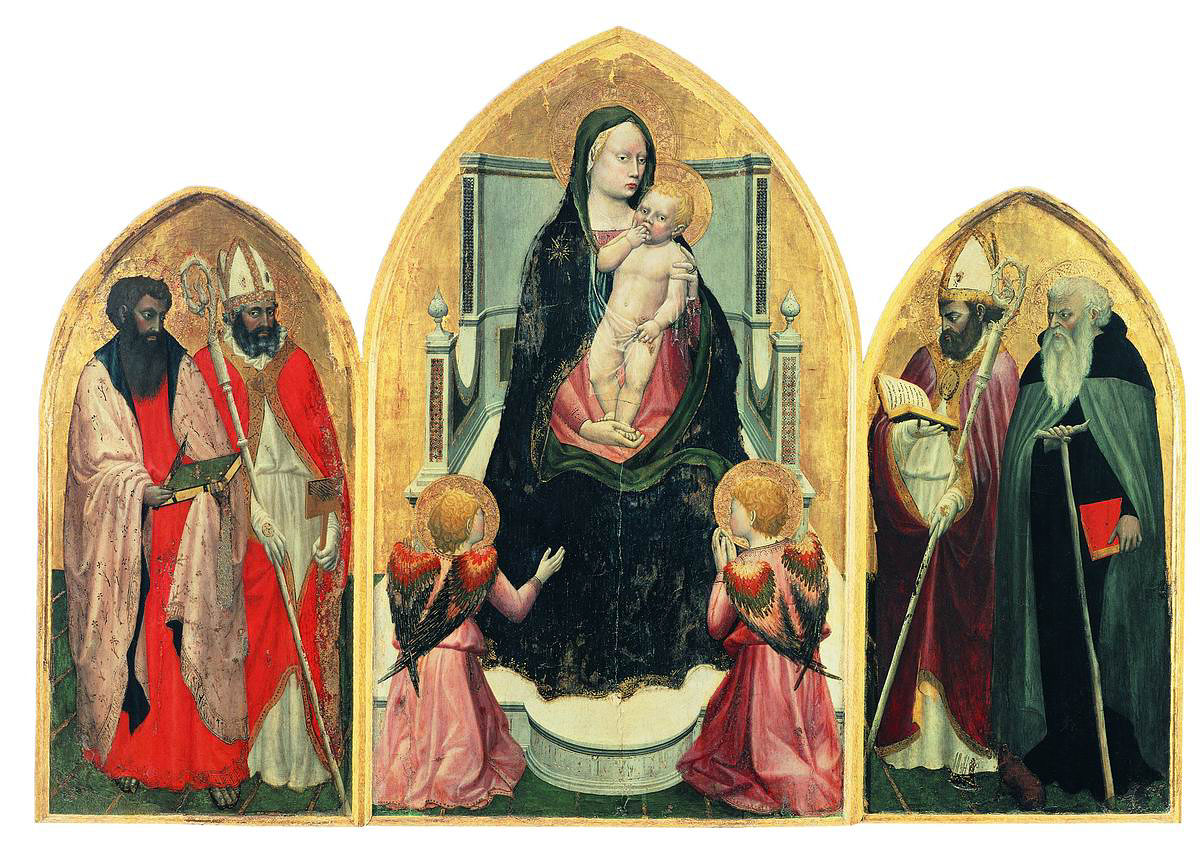
Saint Juvenal of Narni

- May 3 – Juvenal of Narni, Roman Catholic bishop, confessor and saint
- Caesarius of Nazianzus, Byzantine physician and politician (b. 331)
- Pharantzem, Armenian queen and regent (approximate date)
- Valentinus, Roman criminal and rebel leader
