= 361 =

361 in various calendars
- Gregorian calendar: 361; CCCLXI
- Ab urbe condita: 1114
- Assyrian calendar: 5111
- Balinese saka calendar: 282–283
- Bengali calendar: −233 – −232
- Berber calendar: 1311
- Buddhist calendar: 905
- Burmese calendar: −277
- Byzantine calendar: 5869–5870
- Chinese calendar: 庚申年 (Metal Monkey); 3058 or 2851 — to — 辛酉年 (Metal Rooster); 3059 or 2852
- Coptic calendar: 77–78
- Discordian calendar: 1527
- Ethiopian calendar: 353–354
- Hebrew calendar: 4121–4122
- Hindu calendars
- Vikram Samvat: 417–418
- Shaka Samvat: 282–283
- Kali Yuga: 3461–3462
- Holocene calendar: 10361
- Iranian calendar: 261 BP – 260 BP
- Islamic calendar: 269 BH – 268 BH
- Javanese calendar: 243–244
- Julian calendar: 361; CCCLXI
- Korean calendar: 2694
- Minguo calendar: 1551 before ROC 民前1551年
- Nanakshahi calendar: −1107
- Seleucid era: 672/673 AG
- Thai solar calendar: 903–904
- Tibetan calendar: ལྕགས་ཕོ་སྤྲེ་ལོ་ (male Iron-Monkey); 487 or 106 or −666 — to — ལྕགས་མོ་བྱ་ལོ་ (female Iron-Bird); 488 or 107 or −665

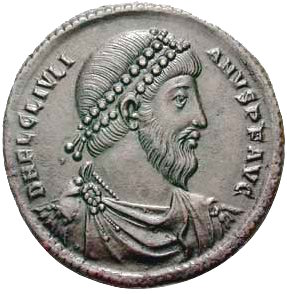
Emperor Julian the Apostate

Year 361 (CCCLXI) was a common year starting on Monday of the Julian calendar. At the time, it was known as the Year of the Consulship of Taurus and Florentius (or, less frequently, year 1114 Ab urbe condita). The denomination 361 for this year has been used since the early medieval period, when the Anno Domini calendar era became the prevalent method in Europe for naming years.

== Events ==
=== By place ===
==== Roman Empire ====
- July – Julian begins leading his troops eastwards against Constantius II.
- November 3 – Emperor Constantius II dies of a fever at Mopsuestia in Cilicia, age 44; on his deathbed he is baptised, and declares his cousin Julian rightful successor.
- December 11 – Julian becomes sole emperor of the Roman Empire; he rules from Constantinople, and tries to restore paganism. Constantius II is buried in the Church of the Holy Apostles.
- Ministers and followers of Constantius II are put on trial, at the Chalcedon Tribunal.

==== China ====
- July 10 – Sixteen Kingdoms: Jin Aidi, age 20, succeeds Jin Mudi, as emperor of the Eastern Jin Dynasty.

=== By topic ===
==== Art ====
- 361–363 – A Julian the Apostate coin is issued. It is now kept at the British Museum, London.

==== Medicine ====
- Constantinople enforces a strict licensing system for physicians.

==== Religion ====
- Emperor Julian tries to organize a pagan church and substitute it for Christianity. Pope Liberius repudiates the Arian creed, and declares that the Council of Ariminum has no authority to issue decrees.
- Gregory Nazianzus (Saint Gregory the Theologian) returns to Nazianzus and is appointed a priest by his father, who wants him to assist local Christians.
- Construction of the Monastery of Saint Anthony in the Eastern Desert of Egypt begins.
- December 24 – George of Cappadocia, the Arian intruding bishop of Alexandria, is murdered in his see and Athanasius of Alexandria returns to his native city in triumph.

== Deaths ==
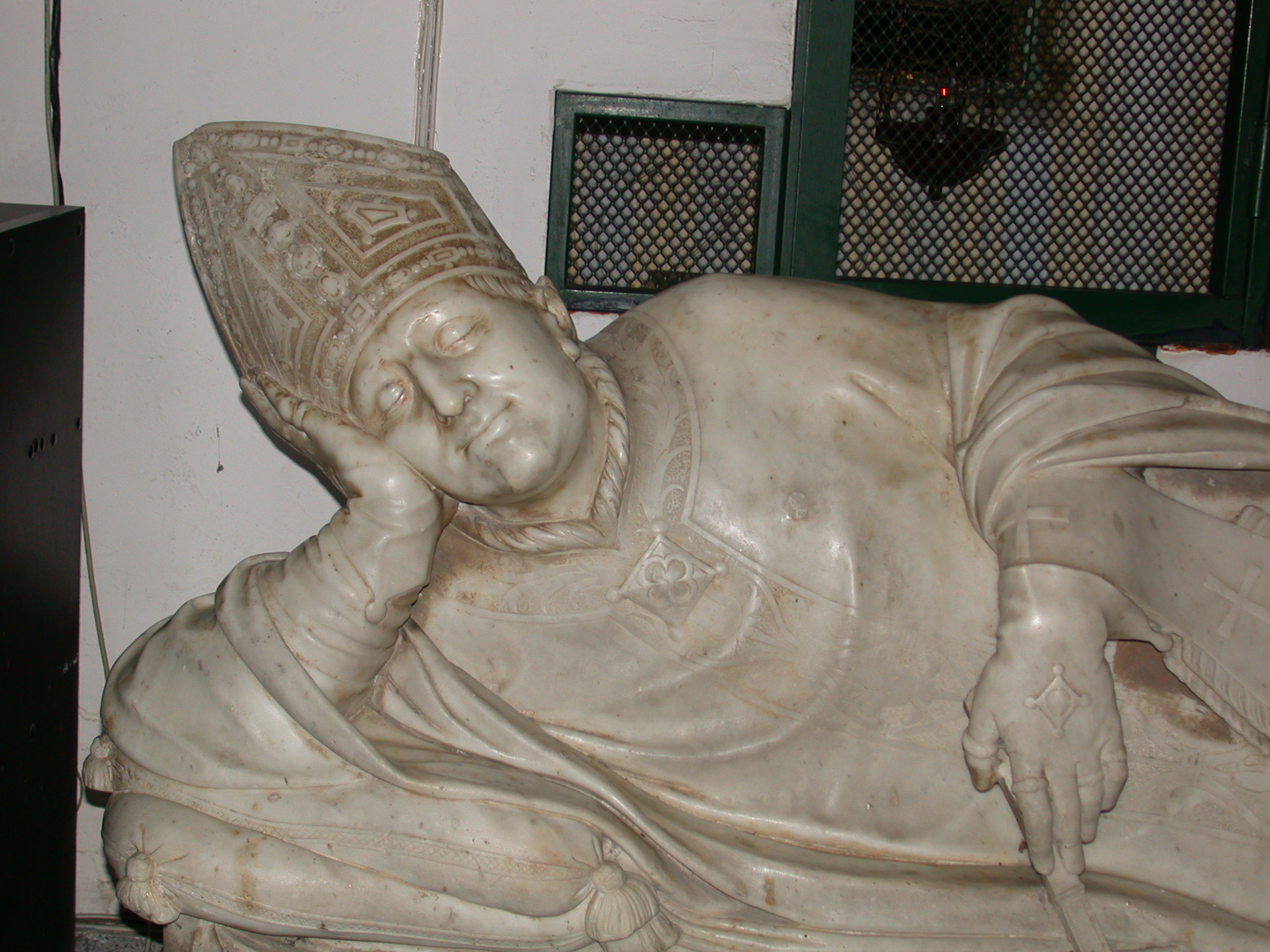
Saint Maximus of Naples

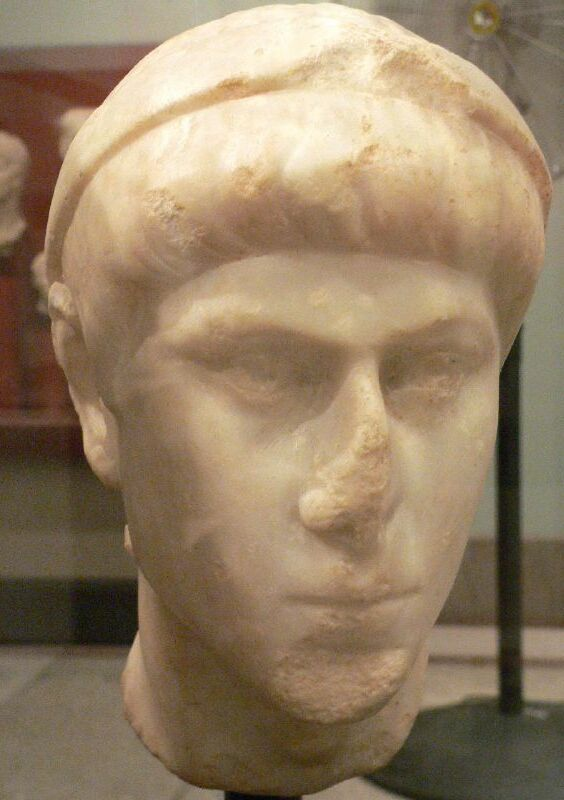
Emperor Constantius II

- November – Constantius II, Roman Emperor (b. 317)
- December 24
  - George of Cappadocia, Byzantine Orthodox archbishop and saint
  - George of Laodicea, Byzantine Orthodox archbishop and saint

=== Date unknown ===
- Apodemius, Roman officer and secret agent
- Eusebius, Roman officer
- Jin Mudi, emperor of the Eastern Jin Dynasty (b. 343)
- Li Shi, emperor of the Chinese Ba Di state Cheng Han
- Maximus of Naples, Roman Catholic archbishop and saint
- Song Hun, regent of the Chinese state Former Liang
- Wang Xizhi, Chinese calligrapher (b. 303)
- Zhu Jingjian, Chinese Buddhist nun (b. 292)
