= 357 =

357 in various calendars
| Gregorian calendar | 357; CCCLVII |
| Ab urbe condita | 1110 |
| Assyrian calendar | 5107 |
| Balinese saka calendar | 278–279 |
| Bengali calendar | −237 – −236 |
| Berber calendar | 1307 |
| Buddhist calendar | 901 |
| Burmese calendar | −281 |
| Byzantine calendar | 5865–5866 |
| Chinese calendar | 丙辰年 (Fire Dragon); 3054 or 2847 — to — 丁巳年 (Fire Snake); 3055 or 2848 |
| Coptic calendar | 73–74 |
| Discordian calendar | 1523 |
| Ethiopian calendar | 349–350 |
| Hebrew calendar | 4117–4118 |
- Hindu calendars
| Vikram Samvat | 413–414 |
| Shaka Samvat | 278–279 |
| Kali Yuga | 3457–3458 |
| Holocene calendar | 10357 |
| Iranian calendar | 265 BP – 264 BP |
| Islamic calendar | 273 BH – 272 BH |
| Javanese calendar | 239–240 |
| Julian calendar | 357; CCCLVII |
| Korean calendar | 2690 |
| Minguo calendar | 1555 before ROC 民前1555年 |
| Nanakshahi calendar | −1111 |
| Seleucid era | 668/669 AG |
| Thai solar calendar | 899–900 |
| Tibetan calendar | མེ་ཕོ་འབྲུག་ལོ་ (male Fire-Dragon); 483 or 102 or −670 — to — མེ་མོ་སྦྲུལ་ལོ་ (female Fire-Snake); 484 or 103 or −669 |

Battle of Strasbourg (Argentoratum)

Year 357 (CCCLVII) was a common year starting on Wednesday of the Julian calendar. At the time, it was known as the Year of the Consulship of Constantius and Iulianus (or, less frequently, year 1110 Ab urbe condita). The denomination 357 for this year has been used since the early medieval period, when the Anno Domini calendar era became the prevalent method in Europe for naming years.

== Events ==
=== By place ===
==== Roman Empire ====
- April 28 – Emperor Constantius II enters Rome for the first time to celebrate his victory over Magnentius. He address the Senate and the Roman people.
- Summer – Battle of Strasbourg: Julian, Caesar (deputy emperor) and supreme commander of the Roman army in Gaul, wins an important victory against the Alemanni at Strasbourg (Argentoratum), driving the barbarians back behind the Rhine.
- The Imperial Library of Constantinople is founded.
- Ammianus Marcellinus describes the Pantheon as being "rounded like the boundary of the horizon and vaulted with a beautiful loftiness".
- Winter – Constantius II receives ambassadors from the Persian Empire. They demand that Rome restore the lands surrendered by King Narseh.

==== Asia ====
- The reign of Fú Jiān, the emperor of Former Qin, commences in China.
- The Alans rout the Hun army in Western Asia.

==== Ireland ====
- Saran, King of Ulster, is overthrown.

=== By topic ===
==== Religion ====
- Late in the year Pope Liberius travels to Sirmium (Pannonia) and agrees to sign documents that effectively undo the Nicene Creed (which implicitly disavows Arianism) and to sever his relationship with the former Alexandrian patriarch Athanasius, who is replaced as patriarch of Alexandria by his Arian opponent George of Cappadocia.
- At about this date, the relics of St Andrew the Apostle are taken from Patras to Constantinople by order of the Emperor Constantius II, and deposited in the Church of the Holy Apostles.
- At about this date, Basil of Caesarea visits Egypt.

== Deaths ==
- Fu Sheng, Chinese emperor of the Di state Former Qin (b. 335)
- Xie Shang (or Renzu), Chinese general and musician (b. 308)
- Yao Xiang (or Jingguo), Chinese general and warlord (b. 331)
