= 368 =

368 in various calendars
Gregorian calendar	368; CCCLXVIII
Ab urbe condita	1121
Assyrian calendar	5118
Balinese saka calendar	289–290
Bengali calendar	−226 – −225
Berber calendar	1318
Buddhist calendar	912
Burmese calendar	−270
Byzantine calendar	5876–5877
Chinese calendar	丁卯年 (Fire Rabbit); 3065 or 2858 — to — 戊辰年 (Earth Dragon); 3066 or 2859
Coptic calendar	84–85
Discordian calendar	1534
Ethiopian calendar	360–361
Hebrew calendar	4128–4129
- Hindu calendars
Vikram Samvat	424–425
Shaka Samvat	289–290
Kali Yuga	3468–3469
Holocene calendar	10368
Iranian calendar	254 BP – 253 BP
Islamic calendar	262 BH – 261 BH
Javanese calendar	250–251
Julian calendar	368; CCCLXVIII
Korean calendar	2701
Minguo calendar	1544 before ROC 民前1544年
Nanakshahi calendar	−1100
Seleucid era	679/680 AG
Thai solar calendar	910–911
Tibetan calendar	མེ་མོ་ཡོས་ལོ་ (female Fire-Hare); 494 or 113 or −659 — to — ས་ཕོ་འབྲུག་ལོ་ (male Earth-Dragon); 495 or 114 or −658

Year 368 (CCCLXVIII) was a leap year starting on Tuesday of the Julian calendar. At the time, it was known as the Year of the Consulship of Augustus and Valens (or, less frequently, year 1121 Ab urbe condita). The denomination 368 for this year has been used since the early medieval period, when the Anno Domini calendar era became the prevalent method in Europe for naming years.

== Events ==
=== By place ===
==== Roman Empire ====
- Spring – Emperor Valentinian I and his 8-year-old son, Gratian, cross the Rhine with an army into Alamannic territory. He defeats the Alemanni and burns food stores along the border. A temporary peace is signed with Macrian, king of the Bucinobantes, and Valentinian returns to his capital Augusta Treverorum (modern Trier).
- Great Conspiracy: Picts, Scotti and Saxons reach Roman London and plunder the city. Theodosius, a general (Comes Britanniarum), is sent with a relief force to Britannia. He marches from Richborough, Kent, to deal with the invaders.
- Winter – The barbarians are driven back to their homelands, Hadrian's Wall is retaken and order returns to the Roman diocese. Theodosius reorganises the abandoned forts and mounts punitive expeditions in Hibernia (Ireland).

==== Asia ====
- 11 October – An earthquake strikes Nicaea (modern Turkey).

== Births ==
- Eustochium, Christian Desert Mother and saint (approximate date)
- Juqu Mengxun, Chinese prince of the Northern Liang (d. 433)
- Philostorgius, Anomoean church historian and writer (d. 439)

== Deaths ==
- July 7 – Maternien, Christian bishop and saint

=== Date unknown ===
- Caesarius of Nazianzus, Roman physician and politician
- Vulcacius Rufinus, Roman prefect, consul and politician
- Yue Wan, Chinese general and politician of Former Yan
