= 364 =

364 in various calendars
Gregorian calendar	364; CCCLXIV
Ab urbe condita	1117
Assyrian calendar	5114
Balinese saka calendar	285–286
Bengali calendar	−230 – −229
Berber calendar	1314
Buddhist calendar	908
Burmese calendar	−274
Byzantine calendar	5872–5873
Chinese calendar	癸亥年 (Water Pig); 3061 or 2854 — to — 甲子年 (Wood Rat); 3062 or 2855
Coptic calendar	80–81
Discordian calendar	1530
Ethiopian calendar	356–357
Hebrew calendar	4124–4125
- Hindu calendars
Vikram Samvat	420–421
Shaka Samvat	285–286
Kali Yuga	3464–3465
Holocene calendar	10364
Iranian calendar	258 BP – 257 BP
Islamic calendar	266 BH – 265 BH
Javanese calendar	246–247
Julian calendar	364; CCCLXIV
Korean calendar	2697
Minguo calendar	1548 before ROC 民前1548年
Nanakshahi calendar	−1104
Seleucid era	675/676 AG
Thai solar calendar	906–907
Tibetan calendar	ཆུ་མོ་ཕག་ལོ་ (female Water-Boar); 490 or 109 or −663 — to — ཤིང་ཕོ་བྱི་བ་ལོ་ (male Wood-Rat); 491 or 110 or −662

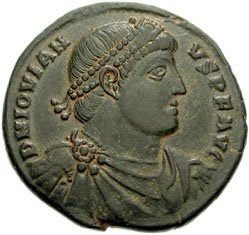
Emperor Jovian (363-364)

Year 364 (CCCLXIV) was a leap year starting on Thursday of the Julian calendar. At the time, it was known as the Year of the Consulship of Augustus and Varronianus (or, less frequently, year 1117 Ab urbe condita). The denomination 364 for this year has been used since the early medieval period, when the Anno Domini calendar era became the prevalent method in Europe for naming years.

== Events ==
=== By place ===
==== Roman Empire ====
- February 17 – Emperor Jovian dies after a reign of eight months. He is found dead in his tent at Tyana (Asia Minor) en route back to Constantinople, in suspicious circumstances.
- February 26 – Valentinian I is proclaimed Emperor by officers of the Roman army at Nicaea in Bithynia. He addresses the soldiers (who threaten to riot) in a speech. He founds the Valentinianic dynasty and rules the Western portion of the Roman Empire, from Caledonia (Scotland) to the Rhine frontier, ensuring it a few years of relative security. He settles in Lutetia (Paris) and establishes a militia to defend the region.
- March 28 – Valens, brother of Valentinian I, is appointed co-emperor (Augustus) in the palace of Hebdomon (Turkey). He rules the Eastern portion of the Roman Empire, from the Danube to the Persian border, and begins the first anti-pagan persecutions.
- Britain is forced to endure fierce barbarian raids.

=== By topic ===
==== Religion ====
- The Council of Laodicea decides some disciplinary questions of the church and attempts to establish the Biblical canon, but fails.

==== Science ====
- Theon of Alexandria, Greek mathematician, observes a solar eclipse (June 16) and a lunar eclipse (November 25).

== Births ==
- Blaesilla, Roman noblewoman (d. 384)
- Huiguo, Chinese Buddhist nun (d. 433)
- Sima Daozi, Chinese prince and regent (d. 403)
- Xu Xianzhi, Chinese official and regent (d. 426)

== Deaths ==
- February 17 – Jovian, Roman emperor (b. 331)
- Ge Hong, Chinese scholar and taoist (b. 283)
- Theophilos the Indian, Christian bishop
