= 433 =

433 in various calendars
Gregorian calendar	433; CDXXXIII
Ab urbe condita	1186
Assyrian calendar	5183
Balinese saka calendar	354–355
Bengali calendar	−161 – −160
Berber calendar	1383
Buddhist calendar	977
Burmese calendar	−205
Byzantine calendar	5941–5942
Chinese calendar	壬申年 (Water Monkey); 3130 or 2923 — to — 癸酉年 (Water Rooster); 3131 or 2924
Coptic calendar	149–150
Discordian calendar	1599
Ethiopian calendar	425–426
Hebrew calendar	4193–4194
- Hindu calendars
Vikram Samvat	489–490
Shaka Samvat	354–355
Kali Yuga	3533–3534
Holocene calendar	10433
Iranian calendar	189 BP – 188 BP
Islamic calendar	195 BH – 194 BH
Javanese calendar	317–318
Julian calendar	433; CDXXXIII
Korean calendar	2766
Minguo calendar	1479 before ROC 民前1479年
Nanakshahi calendar	−1035
Seleucid era	744/745 AG
Thai solar calendar	975–976
Tibetan calendar	阳水猴年 (male Water-Monkey); 559 or 178 or −594 — to — 阴水鸡年 (female Water-Rooster); 560 or 179 or −593

Year 433 (CDXXXIII) was a common year starting on Sunday of the Julian calendar. At the time, it was known as the Year of the Consulship of Theodosius and Maximus (or, less frequently, year 1186 Ab urbe condita). The denomination 433 for this year has been used since the early medieval period, when the Anno Domini calendar era became the prevalent method in Europe for naming years.

== Events ==
=== By place ===
==== Roman Empire ====
- Flavius Aetius returns to Italy with the support of the Huns. He gains control over the young emperor Valentinian III, and becomes his "protector".
- Petronius Maximus is appointed consul of the Western Roman Empire.

=== By topic ===
==== Religion ====
- Pope Sixtus III helps to settle a Christological dispute between the patriarchs Cyril of Alexandria and John of Antioch, that has continued since the First Council of Ephesus, two years ago. They sign the "Formula of Reunion", thus ending their conflict over Nestorianism.

== Births ==
- Liu Bing, high official of the Liu Song dynasty (d. 477)

== Deaths ==
- Juqu Mengxun, prince of the Xiongnu state Northern Liang (b. 368)
- Xie Lingyun, Chinese poet of the Southern and Northern dynasties (b. 385)
- Huiguo, Chinese Buddhist Abbess (b. 364)
