= 346 =

346 in various calendars
| Gregorian calendar | 346; CCCXLVI |
| Ab urbe condita | 1099 |
| Assyrian calendar | 5096 |
| Balinese saka calendar | 267–268 |
| Bengali calendar | −248 – −247 |
| Berber calendar | 1296 |
| Buddhist calendar | 890 |
| Burmese calendar | −292 |
| Byzantine calendar | 5854–5855 |
| Chinese calendar | 乙巳年 (Wood Snake); 3043 or 2836 — to — 丙午年 (Fire Horse); 3044 or 2837 |
| Coptic calendar | 62–63 |
| Discordian calendar | 1512 |
| Ethiopian calendar | 338–339 |
| Hebrew calendar | 4106–4107 |
- Hindu calendars
| Vikram Samvat | 402–403 |
| Shaka Samvat | 267–268 |
| Kali Yuga | 3446–3447 |
| Holocene calendar | 10346 |
| Iranian calendar | 276 BP – 275 BP |
| Islamic calendar | 285 BH – 283 BH |
| Javanese calendar | 227–228 |
| Julian calendar | 346; CCCXLVI |
| Korean calendar | 2679 |
| Minguo calendar | 1566 before ROC 民前1566年 |
| Nanakshahi calendar | −1122 |
| Seleucid era | 657/658 AG |
| Thai solar calendar | 888–889 |
| Tibetan calendar | 阴木蛇年 (female Wood-Snake); 472 or 91 or −681 — to — 阳火马年 (male Fire-Horse); 473 or 92 or −680 |

Year 346 (CCCXLVI) was a common year starting on Wednesday of the Julian calendar. In the Roman Empire, it was known as the Year of the Consulship of Constantius and Claudius (or, less frequently, year 1099 Ab urbe condita). The denomination 346 for this year has been used since the early medieval period, when the Anno Domini calendar era became the prevalent method in Europe for naming years.

== Events ==
=== By place ===
==== Asia ====
- In Korea, the Buyeo Kingdom is absorbed by Goguryeo.
- Geunchogo becomes king of the Korean kingdom of Baekje.

=== By topic ===
==== Religion ====
- Emperor Constans I uses his influence to secure the return of Athanasius. He is restored as Patriarch of Alexandria, and documents are compiled relating to his expulsion, under the title Apology Against the Arians.
- Macedonius I, Patriarch of Constantinople, is deposed again by Paul I.
- Julius Firmicus Maternus writes De erroribus profanarum religionum.
- The Visigoths are converted to Arianism by Wulfila.

== Births ==
- Zhang Tianxi, Chinese ruler of Former Liang (d. 406)

== Deaths ==
- He Chong (or Cidao), Chinese politician (b. 292)
- Maximin of Trier, German bishop (approximate date)
- Zhang Jun (or Gongting), Chinese prince (b. 307)
