= Artemius =

Prefect of Roman Egypt and martyr (died 362)

Saint Artemius of Antioch
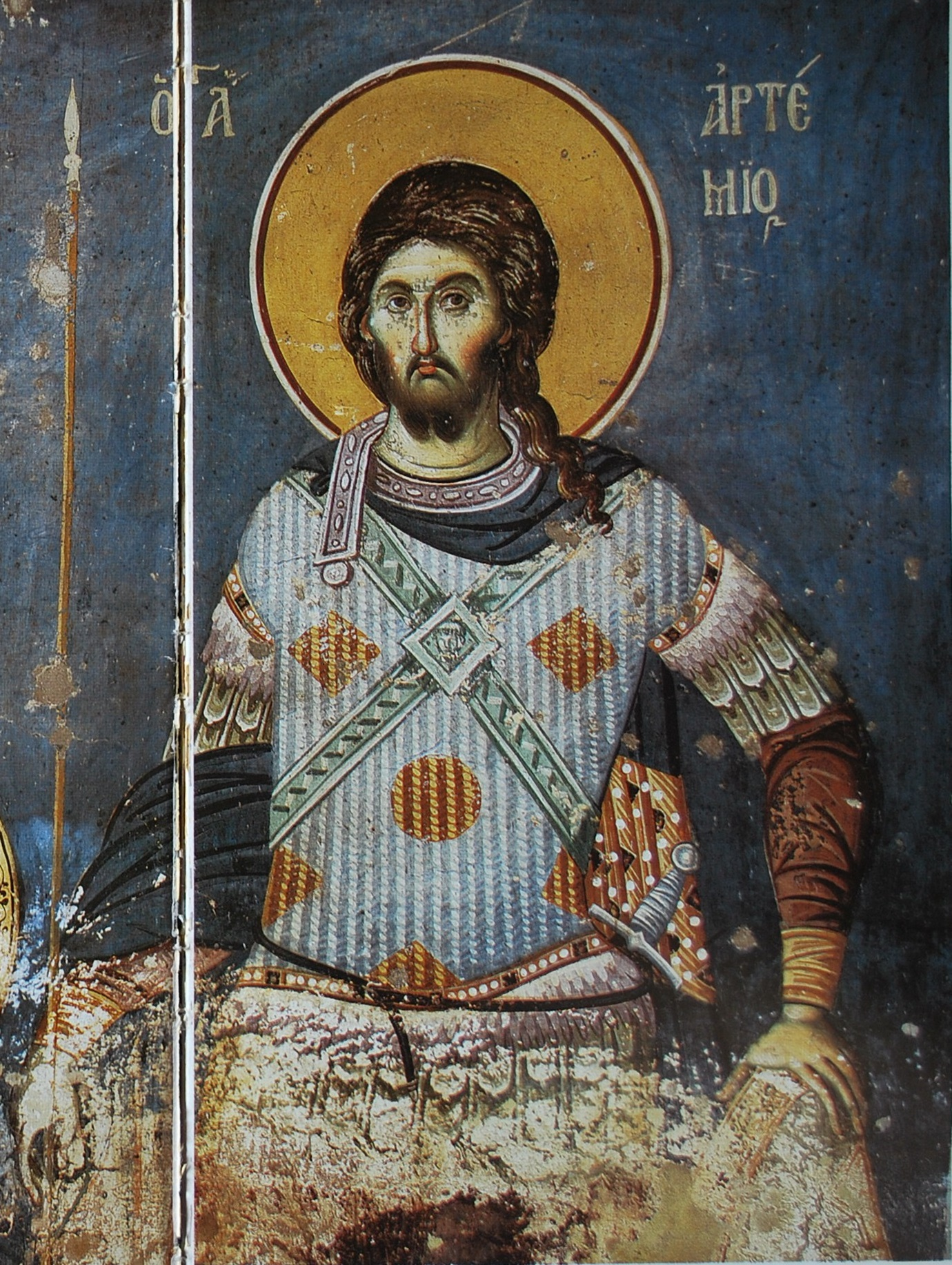
- 14th century Mural of Mar Shalita by Manuel Panselinos from the Macedonian school

Megalomartyr ("Great Martyr"), Shalliṭā
- Born: unknown
- Died: 362; Antioch (relics transferred to Constantinople)
- Canonized: pre-congregation
- Feast: 20 October; September 19 (Assyrian Church of the East)
- Patronage: Archers, politicians, hernias

Artemius (Latin: Flavius Artemius; Ancient Greek: Ἀρτέμιος; died 362), also known as Shallita, spelt Shalita or Chalita (Classical Syriac: ܫܠܝܛܐ, romanized: Shalliṭā, lit. 'The empowered one') was a Syrian general of the Roman Empire and dux Aegypti or imperial prefect of Roman Egypt. He is considered a saint by the Catholic and the Orthodox Churches, by the name of Artemius of Antioch, Mar Shalita of Antioch, and Mar Shalita the Martyr.

== Biography ==
Few details are known of the life and death of Artemius, and many of those details are contradictory, or at least inconsistent, between Christian and pagan early sources. His place or year of birth are not indicated in any historical sources, although at least one tradition quoted in a contemporary source indicates that Artemius was an Egyptian by birth. According to the 8th century compilation, Artemii Passio, he was a Senator and "a notable participant in the highest affairs of [Constantine]". However, the author of the Passio attributes this information to Eusebius, who does not in fact mention Artemius in any of his writings, and this information cannot be confirmed by any other known historical records. Furthermore, stories that place Artemius with Constantine at the Battle of the Milvian Bridge would make Artemius at least eighty years old when martyred by Julian, which would seem doubtful given his activity at the time. The assertion that Artemius was a friend and companion of Constantius II seems reliable. Given the fact that Artemius held the position of dux Aegypti in the final years of Constantinus' reign, as is asserted by a number of early sources, both pagan and Christian, it is clear that it is Constantius who must have awarded Artemius this position. In 360 CE, he was listed in a minute of the Oxyrhyncian Senate, under the name of Flavius Artemius, as holding the rank of dux Aegypti. The Artemii Passio attributes Artemius' ascension to this high position to his successful completion of Constantius' orders to recover the relics of the Apostles Andrew, Luke and Timothy. According to this narrative, Constantius sent Artemius to Achaea to claim the body of Andrew from Patras and the body of Luke from Boeotia. Artemius is also credited there with translating the relics of Timothy from Ionian Ephesus to Constantinople. Apparently in return for these tasks, Constantius awarded Artemius with the administration of Roman Egypt. However, this attribution is not certain, given that other Christian sources that refer to the translation of St. Andrew's remains, including the Chronicon Paschale, written a century earlier, do not refer to Artemius in this regard.

While serving as the military governor of Egypt, Artemius supported the Arian bishop of Alexandria, George the Cappadocian, and took part in the latter's campaign against both the pagan and Orthodox Christian populations. Documented examples of this support include the sacking of the Temple of Serapis in Alexandria, as well as the pursuit of the former, Orthodox, bishop of Alexandria, Athanasius.

In 361 CE, Constantius was succeeded by his cousin Julian, who, on becoming Emperor, broke with his Christian upbringing and took up traditional Roman pagan pantheism. Shortly thereafter, Artemius met his death, in circumstances that are not entirely clear. The Artemii Passio places his death at the hands of Julian, in Antioch, because upon being summoned by Julian from Alexandria, he supported Eugenius and Macarius, two Christian priests from Antioch, against the tortures to which they were subjected by Julian. Artemius is further accused by Julian of murdering Julian's half-brother, Gallus. Despite Artemius' denials, Julian proceeds to have Artemius tortured in various fashions while exhorting Artemius to renounce his Christianity. Artemius repeatedly confirms his faith, and ultimately has his head cut off. According to the Chronicon Paschale, Artemius dies in Alexandria. Ammianus describes Artemius' death as occurring after Artemius is no longer dux Aegypti, when he is executed for the crimes he was accused of committing against the people of Alexandria. Julian himself provides a similar reason. While Ammianus does not provide the location of Artemius' death, his language indicates that it was not at Alexandria, thus perhaps strengthening the contention that it was indeed at Antioch.

== Hagiography ==
Artemius is considered a martyr and Saint in the Catholic, Oriental Orthodox Churches and Eastern Orthodox Churches, despite his apparent adherence to Arianism during his life. His acceptance as a martyr is based on the tradition found in Christian sources that he was tortured and executed by Julian for speaking on behalf of Christianity in the face of the apostate Emperor Julian, and his unwillingness to renounce his Christianity despite Julian's promises to allow him to live and restore him to his offices.

His canonization is based on the anonymous late 7th century compilation of 45 miracles with which he is attributed. As described in the 45 miracles attributed to him, St. Artemios specializes in miracles dealing with medicine and healing, and in particular with hernias, and testicular and genital maladies in men. One miracle dealing with the healing of a woman is attributed to St. Artemios through his sending St. Febronia, who occupies a parallel construct for women.

His feast day was set as 20 October. His cult site was the Church of Saint John the Forerunner (St John the Baptist) in Constantinople. St. Artemius is invoked by those suffering from hernias.
