= 292 =

292 in various calendars
- Gregorian calendar: 292; CCXCII
- Ab urbe condita: 1045
- Assyrian calendar: 5042
- Balinese saka calendar: 213–214
- Bengali calendar: −302 – −301
- Berber calendar: 1242
- Buddhist calendar: 836
- Burmese calendar: −346
- Byzantine calendar: 5800–5801
- Chinese calendar: 辛亥年 (Metal Pig); 2989 or 2782 — to — 壬子年 (Water Rat); 2990 or 2783
- Coptic calendar: 8–9
- Discordian calendar: 1458
- Ethiopian calendar: 284–285
- Hebrew calendar: 4052–4053
- Hindu calendars
- Vikram Samvat: 348–349
- Shaka Samvat: 213–214
- Kali Yuga: 3392–3393
- Holocene calendar: 10292
- Iranian calendar: 330 BP – 329 BP
- Islamic calendar: 340 BH – 339 BH
- Javanese calendar: 172–173
- Julian calendar: 292; CCXCII
- Korean calendar: 2625
- Minguo calendar: 1620 before ROC 民前1620年
- Nanakshahi calendar: −1176
- Seleucid era: 603/604 AG
- Thai solar calendar: 834–835
- Tibetan calendar: ལྕགས་མོ་ཕག་ལོ་ (female Iron-Boar); 418 or 37 or −735 — to — ཆུ་ཕོ་བྱི་བ་ལོ་ (male Water-Rat); 419 or 38 or −734

Year 292 (CCXCII) was a leap year starting on Friday of the Julian calendar. At the time, it was known as the Year of the Consulship of Hannibalianus and Asclepiodotus (or, less frequently, year 1045 Ab urbe condita). The denomination 292 for this year has been used since the early medieval period, when the Anno Domini calendar era became the prevalent method in Europe for naming years.

== Events ==
=== By place ===
==== Roman Empire ====
- The jurist Gregorius, at the court of Emperor Diocletian, produces the Gregorian Code, the first codification of Roman law (approximate date).

==== Egypt ====
- The Upper Egypt revolts of (292–293) outbreak in Egypt, centralized in the city of Thebes, primarily involving other Egyptian cities such as Busiris and Coptos. A precursor to the much larger national Egyptian rebellion that followed a few years later.

==== Asia ====
- Bongsang becomes ruler of the Korean kingdom of Goguryeo.

==== Mesoamerica ====
- The oldest known Mayan stele is erected at the capital Tikal (modern Guatemala).

== Births ==
- He Chong (or Cidao), Chinese politician (d. 346)
- Pachomius, Christian theologian and writer (d. 348)
- Zhu Jingjian, Chinese Buddhist nun (d. 361)

== Deaths ==
- Yang Zhi, Chinese empress of the Jin Dynasty (b. 259)
