= 307 =

307 in various calendars
Gregorian calendar	307; CCCVII
Ab urbe condita	1060
Assyrian calendar	5057
Balinese saka calendar	228–229
Bengali calendar	−287 – −286
Berber calendar	1257
Buddhist calendar	851
Burmese calendar	−331
Byzantine calendar	5815–5816
Chinese calendar	丙寅年 (Fire Tiger); 3004 or 2797 — to — 丁卯年 (Fire Rabbit); 3005 or 2798
Coptic calendar	23–24
Discordian calendar	1473
Ethiopian calendar	299–300
Hebrew calendar	4067–4068
- Hindu calendars
Vikram Samvat	363–364
Shaka Samvat	228–229
Kali Yuga	3407–3408
Holocene calendar	10307
Iranian calendar	315 BP – 314 BP
Islamic calendar	325 BH – 324 BH
Javanese calendar	187–188
Julian calendar	307; CCCVII
Korean calendar	2640
Minguo calendar	1605 before ROC 民前1605年
Nanakshahi calendar	−1161
Seleucid era	618/619 AG
Thai solar calendar	849–850
Tibetan calendar	མེ་ཕོ་སྟག་ལོ་ (male Fire-Tiger); 433 or 52 or −720 — to — མེ་མོ་ཡོས་ལོ་ (female Fire-Hare); 434 or 53 or −719

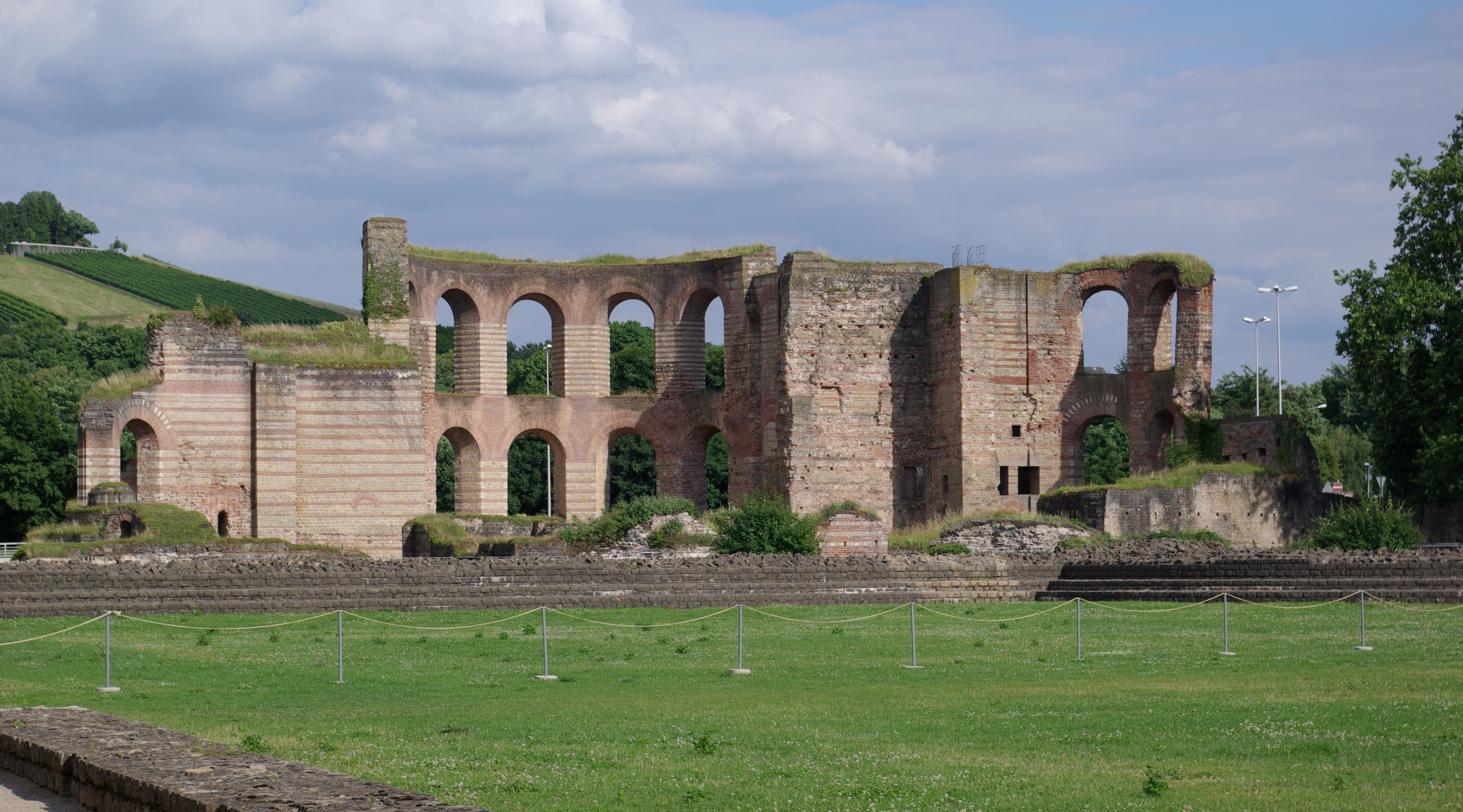
Imperial Baths (Kaiserthermen)

Year 307 (CCCVII) was a common year starting on Wednesday of the Julian calendar. At the time, it was known as the Year of the Consulship of Severus and Maximinus (or, less frequently, year 1060 Ab urbe condita). The denomination 307 for this year has been used since the early medieval period, when the Anno Domini calendar era became the prevalent method in Europe for naming years.

== Events ==
=== By place ===
==== Roman Empire ====
- Winter: Emperor Galerius wins his second victory over the Sarmatians.
- Galerius sends Valerius Severus with the army of northern Italy, to suppress the rebellion in Rome. However, faced with their former emperor Maximian, the soldiers desert him, and Severus flees to Ravenna. Maximian besieges Severus in Ravenna, who then surrenders. Maxentius makes Severus a hostage, in an attempt to keep Galerius at bay.
- Summer: Anticipating an offensive by Galerius, Maximian travels to Gaul to make an alliance with Constantine I.
- Late summer or autumn: Galerius invades Italy but Maxentius remains behind the walls of Rome. Galerius finds he cannot besiege the city, and the image of an emperor making efforts against Rome hurts Galerius' image among the troops. The fact that Maxentius is his son-in-law does not help, and Maxentius makes an effort to bribe Galerius' troops. Galerius unsuccessfully attempts to negotiate, and recognizing Maxentius' attempts at bribery and the danger of being trapped in Italy by Maximian and Constantine, Galerius chooses to withdraw from Italy. To satiate his troops during the withdrawal, he pillages the Italian countryside. Meanwhile, Maxentius executes Severus.
- November 11 – Following the murder of Severus, Galerius promotes Licinius to Augustus.
- December: Constantine marries Maximian's daughter Fausta, and is promoted to Augustus by Maximian.
- Near the end of the year, Galerius gives his wife (Diocletian's daughter) Galeria Valeria the title of Augusta.

==== China ====
- January 8 – Emperor Hui of Jin dies after a 16-year reign, in which eight dukes of the imperial family have conducted a civil war (War of the Eight Princes) against each other in a struggle for power. Huai of Jin, age 23, succeeds his father and becomes the third ruler of the Jin Dynasty.

== Births ==
- Zhang Jun, Chinese prince of the Jin Dynasty (d. 346)

== Deaths ==
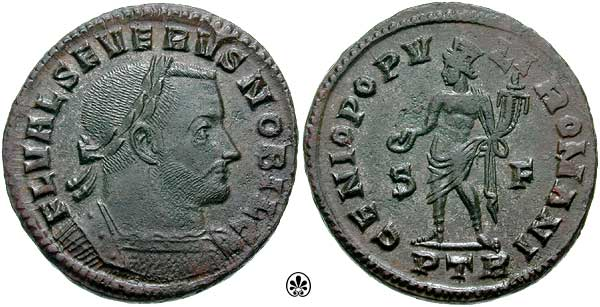
Severus II

- January 8 – Hui of Jin, Chinese emperor of the Jin Dynasty (b. 259)
- September 16 – Severus II, Roman emperor (murdered)
- Septimius of Iesi, German bishop, martyr and saint
- Tuoba Luguan, Chinese chieftain of the Tuoba clan
