= 308 =

308 in various calendars
Gregorian calendar	308; CCCVIII
Ab urbe condita	1061
Assyrian calendar	5058
Balinese saka calendar	229–230
Bengali calendar	−286 – −285
Berber calendar	1258
Buddhist calendar	852
Burmese calendar	−330
Byzantine calendar	5816–5817
Chinese calendar	丁卯年 (Fire Rabbit); 3005 or 2798 — to — 戊辰年 (Earth Dragon); 3006 or 2799
Coptic calendar	24–25
Discordian calendar	1474
Ethiopian calendar	300–301
Hebrew calendar	4068–4069
- Hindu calendars
Vikram Samvat	364–365
Shaka Samvat	229–230
Kali Yuga	3408–3409
Holocene calendar	10308
Iranian calendar	314 BP – 313 BP
Islamic calendar	324 BH – 323 BH
Javanese calendar	188–189
Julian calendar	308; CCCVIII
Korean calendar	2641
Minguo calendar	1604 before ROC 民前1604年
Nanakshahi calendar	−1160
Seleucid era	619/620 AG
Thai solar calendar	850–851
Tibetan calendar	མེ་མོ་ཡོས་ལོ་ (female Fire-Hare); 434 or 53 or −719 — to — ས་ཕོ་འབྲུག་ལོ་ (male Earth-Dragon); 435 or 54 or −718

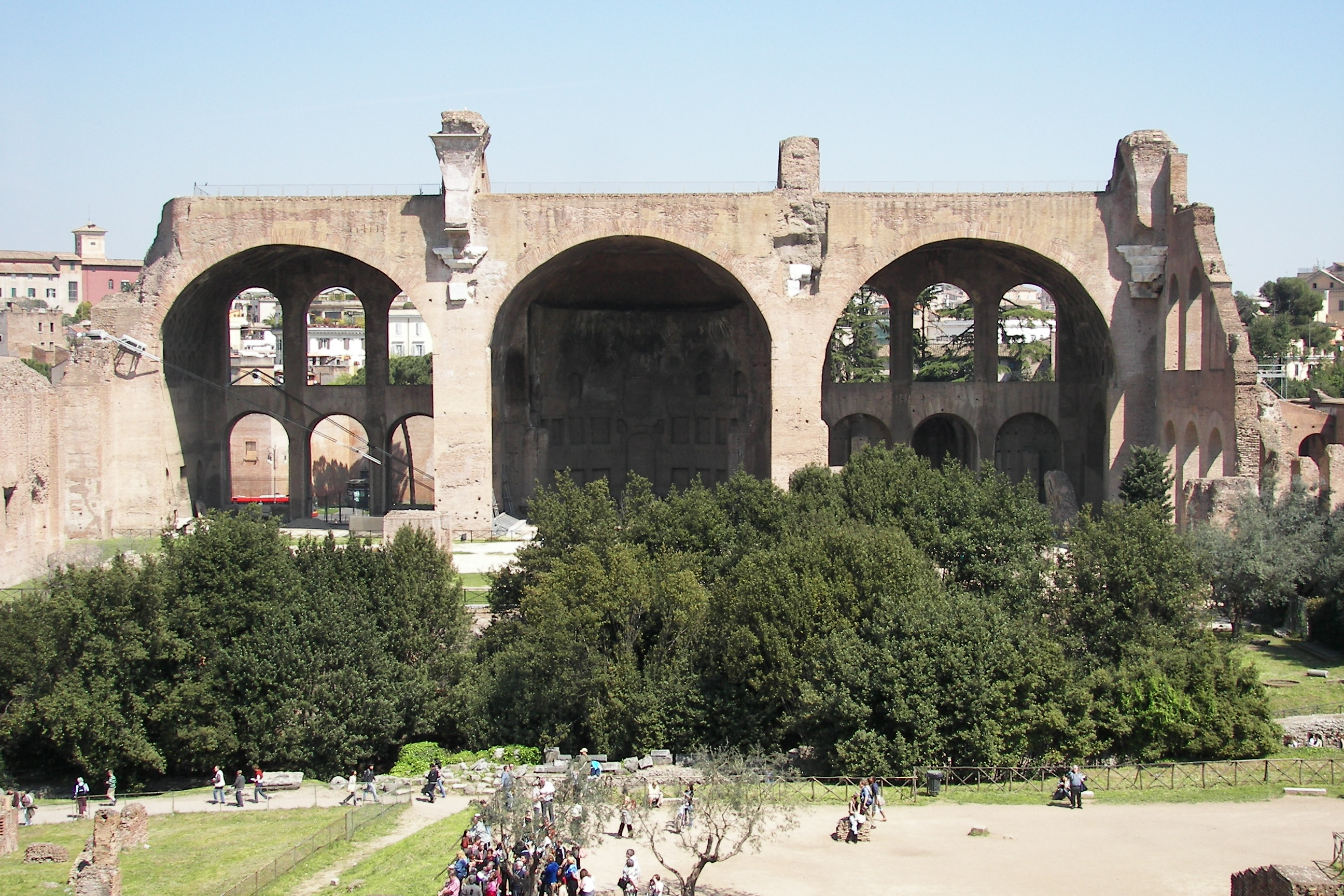
Basilica of Maxentius (Rome)

Year 308 (CCCVIII) was a leap year starting on Thursday of the Julian calendar. It was known in the Roman Empire as the Year of the Consulship of Diocletian and (Galerius) Maximianus (or, less frequently, year 1061 Ab urbe condita). The denomination 308 for this year has been used since the early medieval period, when the Anno Domini calendar era became the prevalent method in Europe for naming years.

== Events ==
=== By place ===
==== Roman Empire ====
- Winter: Emperor Galerius wins his third and final victory over the Sarmatians.
- April: In Rome, Emperor Maximian attempts to depose his son Maxentius, but the soldiers in Rome side with Maxentius and force Maximian to flee to the court of Constantine I.
- The overthrow of Maximian prompts the soldiers of Roman Africa to prop up the vicarius of Africa, Domitius Alexander, as a usurper.
- Constantine raids the territory of the Bructeri and builds a bridge across the Rhine at Cologne.
- November 11 – The Conference of Carnuntum: Attempting to keep peace within the Roman Empire, Galerius recalls Diocletian briefly from retirement, and they convene with Maximian. Diocletian persuades Maximian to return to retirement, and he and Galerius declare Maxentius a public enemy. Licinius is proclaimed Augustus of the west, while rival contender Constantine I is again declared Caesar.
- Bereft of his father's support, Maxentius increasingly presents himself as the Conservator Urbis Suae (Preserver of His Own City). Construction of the Basilica of Maxentius (or Basilica Nova), the largest building in the Roman Forum, is begun.
- Maxentius institutes toleration of the Christians in his territories.

==== Asia ====
- The Han-Zhao Dynasty is established in northern China, marking the official inception of the long lasting Uprising of the Five Barbarians.

=== By topic ===
==== Religion ====
- May 27 or June 26 – Pope Marcellus I succeeds Pope Marcellinus as the 30th pope.

== Births ==
- Xie Shang (or Renzu), Chinese general (d. 357)

== Deaths ==
- Adrian of Batanea (or Eubulus), Christian martyr
