= 259 =

259 in various calendars
Gregorian calendar	259; CCLIX
Ab urbe condita	1012
Assyrian calendar	5009
Balinese saka calendar	180–181
Bengali calendar	−335 – −334
Berber calendar	1209
Buddhist calendar	803
Burmese calendar	−379
Byzantine calendar	5767–5768
Chinese calendar	戊寅年 (Earth Tiger); 2956 or 2749 — to — 己卯年 (Earth Rabbit); 2957 or 2750
Coptic calendar	−25 – −24
Discordian calendar	1425
Ethiopian calendar	251–252
Hebrew calendar	4019–4020
- Hindu calendars
Vikram Samvat	315–316
Shaka Samvat	180–181
Kali Yuga	3359–3360
Holocene calendar	10259
Iranian calendar	363 BP – 362 BP
Islamic calendar	374 BH – 373 BH
Javanese calendar	138–139
Julian calendar	259; CCLIX
Korean calendar	2592
Minguo calendar	1653 before ROC 民前1653年
Nanakshahi calendar	−1209
Seleucid era	570/571 AG
Thai solar calendar	801–802
Tibetan calendar	ས་ཕོ་སྟག་ལོ་ (male Earth-Tiger); 385 or 4 or −768 — to — ས་མོ་ཡོས་ལོ་ (female Earth-Hare); 386 or 5 or −767

Year 259 (CCLIX) was a common year starting on Saturday of the Julian calendar. At the time, it was known as the Year of the Consulship of Aemilianus and Bassus (or, less frequently, year 1012 Ab urbe condita). The denomination 259 for this year has been used since the early medieval period, when the Anno Domini calendar era became the prevalent method in Europe for naming years.

== Events ==
=== By place ===
==== Roman Empire ====
- Emperor Valerian leads an army (70,000 men) to relieve Edessa, besieged by the forces of Persian King Shapur I. An outbreak of a plague kills many legionaries, weakening the Roman position in Syria.
- Battle of Mediolanum: A Germanic confederation, the Alamanni (300,000 warriors), who crossed the Alps, are defeated by Roman legions under Gallienus, near Mediolanum (modern Milan).
- Postumus revolts against Gallienus in Gaul. The western provinces of Britain and Spain join his independent realm—which is called in modern times the Gallic Empire.
- Postumus, governor of Gaul, declares himself Emperor, and continues to rule the Gallic Empire until 269, when he is killed by his soldiers.
- The Roman fort of Wiesbaden (Germany) is captured by the Alamanni (possibly 260).
- The Franks, who invaded the Roman Empire near Cologne in 257, reach Tarraco in Hispania.

==== Persia ====
- Mesopotamia: Odaenathus, the ruler of the kingdom of Palmyra, sacks the city of Nehardea, destroying its great yeshiva.

=== By topic ===
==== Religion ====
- Pope Dionysius is elected as the pope.

== Births ==
- Hui of Jin, Chinese emperor of the Jin Dynasty (d. 307)
- Tao Kan (or Shixing), Chinese general and politician (d. 334)
- Yang Zhi, Chinese empress of the Jin Dynasty (d. 292)

== Deaths ==
- January 10 – Polyeuctus, Roman soldier and saint
- January 18 – Sun Chen, Chinese general and regent (b. 232)
- Augurius of Tarragona, Christian Hispano-Roman clergyman
- Cao Jun (or Zi'an), Chinese prince and son of Cao Cao
- Fructuosus of Tarragona, Christian bishop, martyr and saint
- Wang Chang (or Wenshu), Chinese general and politician
