= Eliphius =

Christian martyr

Saint Eliphius
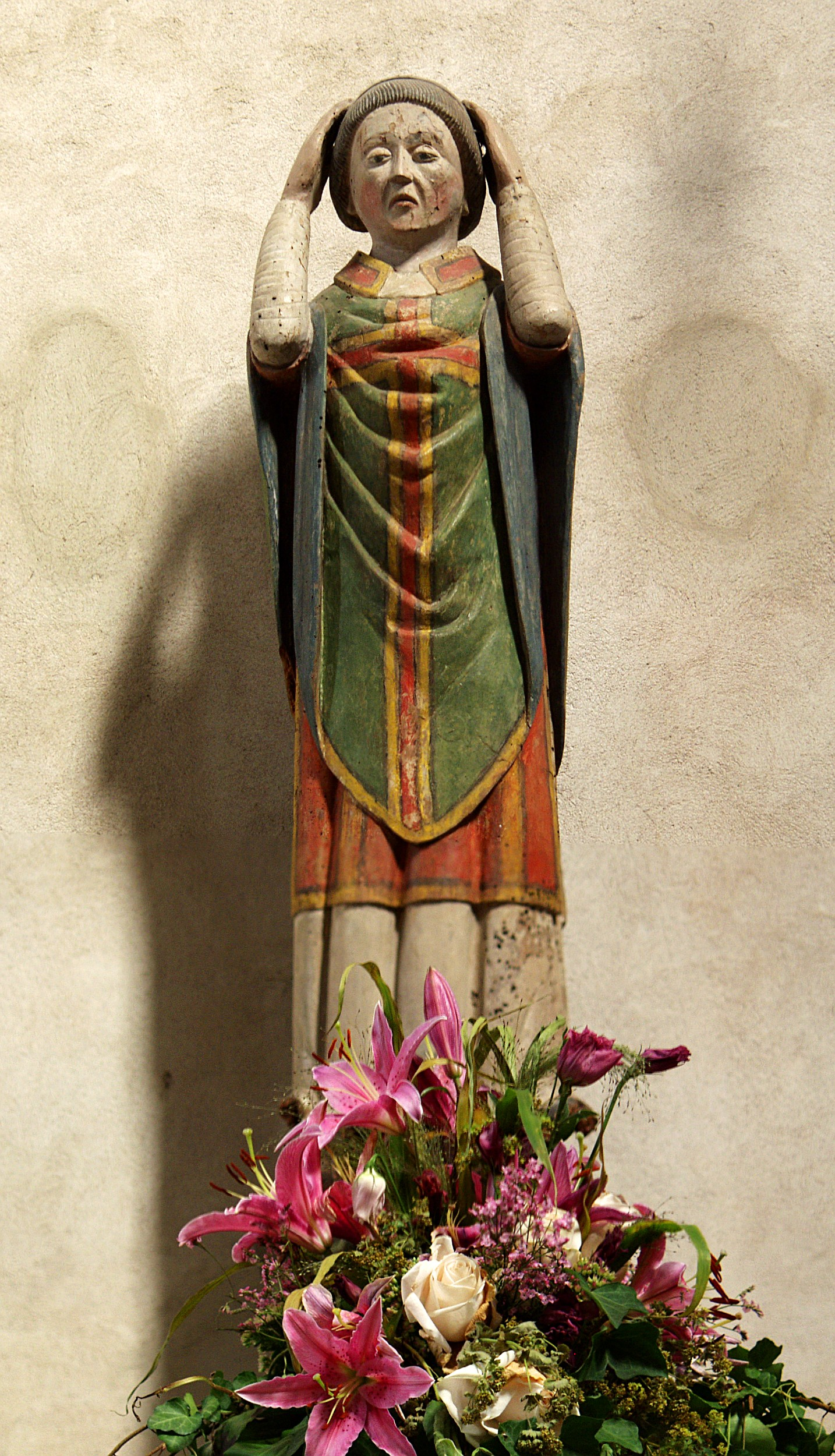
- 12th-century statue of St. Eliphius in Great St. Martin Church, Cologne

Martyr
- Born: Ireland
- Died: 362 AD; Toul, France
- Venerated in: Roman Catholic Church
- Feast: 16 October
- Attributes: Bishop's attire, with his head in his hands

Saint Eliphius or Eloff (Élophe, Éliphe, Alophe) is venerated as a martyr and saint. Tradition holds that he was the child of a king of Scotia, and preached in Toul, where he converted 400 people to Christianity. He was accompanied by his siblings: St. Eucharius, and three sisters, Menna, Libaria, and Susanna. Tradition also makes him a bishop of Toul.

In regard to their alleged royal and Irish birth, James Henthorn Todd states that "we cannot place much reliance on the statement that they were the children of a king of Scotia. Their names are not Irish." In the 12th century, Abbot Rupert of Duitz (Rupertus Tuitiensis), author of the Acts of the saint, was of the opinion that Eliphius and his siblings were natives of Toul.

In his History of Lorraine, Antoine Augustin Calmet does not mention Scotia (which can refer to Ireland or Scotland) and states that according to some scholars, Eliphius could be a native of Soulosse-sous-Saint-Élophe or Gran; as well as the princely son of a man named Baccius.

== Veneration ==
All of the siblings, except Menna, were beheaded at or near Toul, at the order of Julian the Apostate. They were buried at Mount Eliph. The Lorsch Codex mentions the donation of the relics of St. Eliphius to the Great St. Martin Church, Cologne and was the second named patron of the church. These relics were later translated to Toul.
