= 331 =

331 in various calendars
| Gregorian calendar | 331; CCCXXXI |
| Ab urbe condita | 1084 |
| Assyrian calendar | 5081 |
| Balinese saka calendar | 252–253 |
| Bengali calendar | −263 – −262 |
| Berber calendar | 1281 |
| Buddhist calendar | 875 |
| Burmese calendar | −307 |
| Byzantine calendar | 5839–5840 |
| Chinese calendar | 庚寅年 (Metal Tiger); 3028 or 2821 — to — 辛卯年 (Metal Rabbit); 3029 or 2822 |
| Coptic calendar | 47–48 |
| Discordian calendar | 1497 |
| Ethiopian calendar | 323–324 |
| Hebrew calendar | 4091–4092 |
- Hindu calendars
| Vikram Samvat | 387–388 |
| Shaka Samvat | 252–253 |
| Kali Yuga | 3431–3432 |
| Holocene calendar | 10331 |
| Iranian calendar | 291 BP – 290 BP |
| Islamic calendar | 300 BH – 299 BH |
| Javanese calendar | 212–213 |
| Julian calendar | 331; CCCXXXI |
| Korean calendar | 2664 |
| Minguo calendar | 1581 before ROC 民前1581年 |
| Nanakshahi calendar | −1137 |
| Seleucid era | 642/643 AG |
| Thai solar calendar | 873–874 |
| Tibetan calendar | ལྕགས་ཕོ་སྟག་ལོ་ (male Iron-Tiger); 457 or 76 or −696 — to — ལྕགས་མོ་ཡོས་ལོ་ (female Iron-Hare); 458 or 77 or −695 |

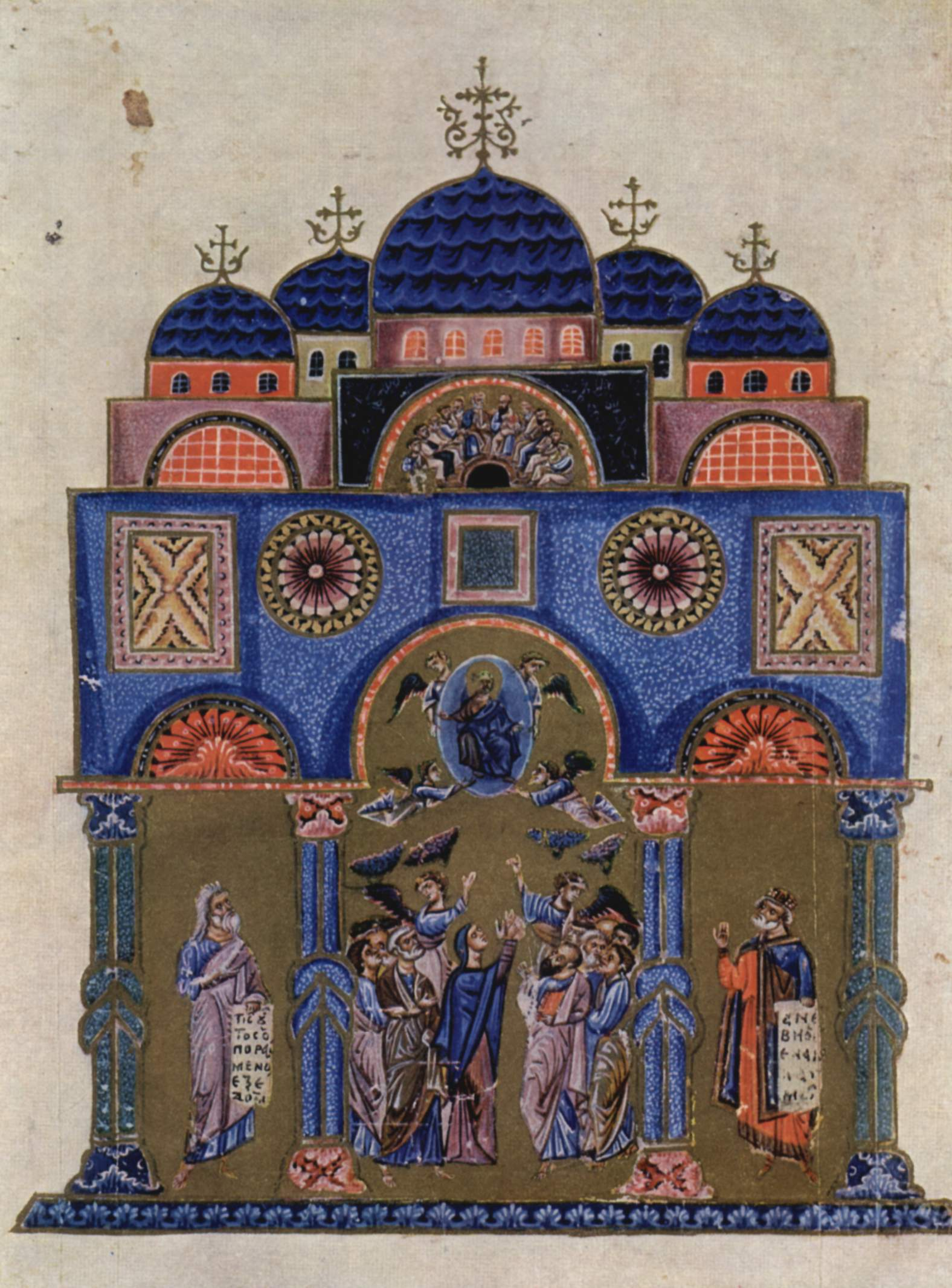
An image of the Church of the Holy Apostles (1162)

Year 331 (CCCXXXI) was a common year starting on Friday of the Julian calendar. At the time, it was known as the Year of the Consulship of Bassus and Ablabius (or, less frequently, year 1084 Ab urbe condita). The denomination 331 for this year has been used since the early medieval period, when the Anno Domini calendar era became the prevalent method in Europe for naming years.

== Events ==
=== By place ===
==== Roman Empire ====
- Emperor Constantine the Great vigorously promotes Christianity, confiscating the property and valuables of a number of pagan temples throughout the Roman Empire.
- Constantine I dedicates the Church of the Holy Apostles in Constantinople.
- Constantine I promulgates a law against divorce.

==== Asia ====
- Gogugwon becomes ruler of the Korean kingdom of Goguryeo.

=== By topic ===
==== Art and Science ====
- Eusebius of Caesarea writes the Onomasticon.

==== Religion ====
- The Fifty Bibles of Constantine are commissioned for use in Constantinople.
- Gregory the Illuminator withdraws to a small sanctuary in the Daranali province (Armenia).

== Births ==
- Jovian, Roman consul and emperor (d. 364)
- (or 332) Julian the Apostate, Roman emperor (d. 363)
- Yao Chang, Chinese emperor of the Qiang state (d. 394)
- Yao Xiang (or Jingguo), Chinese warlord (d. 357)

== Deaths ==
- Gregory the Illuminator, official head of the Armenian Apostolic Church
- Micheon of Goguryeo, Korean ruler of Goguryeo
