= 403 =

403 in various calendars
- Gregorian calendar: 403; CDIII
- Ab urbe condita: 1156
- Assyrian calendar: 5153
- Balinese saka calendar: 324–325
- Bengali calendar: −191 – −190
- Berber calendar: 1353
- Buddhist calendar: 947
- Burmese calendar: −235
- Byzantine calendar: 5911–5912
- Chinese calendar: 壬寅年 (Water Tiger); 3100 or 2893 — to — 癸卯年 (Water Rabbit); 3101 or 2894
- Coptic calendar: 119–120
- Discordian calendar: 1569
- Ethiopian calendar: 395–396
- Hebrew calendar: 4163–4164
- Hindu calendars
- Vikram Samvat: 459–460
- Shaka Samvat: 324–325
- Kali Yuga: 3503–3504
- Holocene calendar: 10403
- Iranian calendar: 219 BP – 218 BP
- Islamic calendar: 226 BH – 225 BH
- Javanese calendar: 286–287
- Julian calendar: 403; CDIII
- Korean calendar: 2736
- Minguo calendar: 1509 before ROC 民前1509年
- Nanakshahi calendar: −1065
- Seleucid era: 714/715 AG
- Thai solar calendar: 945–946
- Tibetan calendar: ཆུ་ཕོ་སྟག་ལོ་ (male Water-Tiger); 529 or 148 or −624 — to — ཆུ་མོ་ཡོས་ལོ་ (female Water-Hare); 530 or 149 or −623

Year 403 (CDIII) was a common year starting on Thursday of the Julian calendar. At the time, it was known as the Year of the Consulship of Theodosius and Rumoridus (or, less frequently, year 1156 Ab urbe condita). The denomination 403 for this year has been used since the early medieval period, when the Anno Domini calendar era became the prevalent method in Europe for naming years.

== Events ==
=== By place ===
==== Roman Empire ====
- June – Battle of Verona: The Visigoths, under command of King Alaric I, invade Italy again, and advance through the Brenner Pass. Stilicho, with an army of 30,000 men, defeats the Goths north of Verona. Alaric makes a truce, and withdraws eastward to Illyricum.
- Emperor Honorius and Stilicho are honored with a triumphal march, for the victories against the Goths and Vandals. This becomes the last victory celebrated in Rome.
- Theodosius II, age 2, becomes consul of the Eastern Roman Empire.

==== Asia ====
- Hui Yuan argues that Buddhist monks should be exempt from bowing to the emperor.
- Asin of Baekje allies with Silla against Gwanggaeto the Great of Goguryeo (Korea).

=== By topic ===
==== Religion ====
- The Synod of the Oak deposes and banishes John Chrysostom, bishop of Constantinople, but shortly afterward he is recalled only to be banished again.

== Births ==
- Hilary, bishop of Arles (d. 449)
- Yuan He, official of the Northern Wei Dynasty (d. 479)

== Deaths ==
- Epiphanius of Salamis, Church Father
- Sima Daozi, regent of the Eastern Jin Dynasty (b. 364)
