= 363 =

363 in various calendars
- Gregorian calendar: 363; CCCLXIII
- Ab urbe condita: 1116
- Assyrian calendar: 5113
- Balinese saka calendar: 284–285
- Bengali calendar: −231 – −230
- Berber calendar: 1313
- Buddhist calendar: 907
- Burmese calendar: −275
- Byzantine calendar: 5871–5872
- Chinese calendar: 壬戌年 (Water Dog); 3060 or 2853 — to — 癸亥年 (Water Pig); 3061 or 2854
- Coptic calendar: 79–80
- Discordian calendar: 1529
- Ethiopian calendar: 355–356
- Hebrew calendar: 4123–4124
- Hindu calendars
- Vikram Samvat: 419–420
- Shaka Samvat: 284–285
- Kali Yuga: 3463–3464
- Holocene calendar: 10363
- Iranian calendar: 259 BP – 258 BP
- Islamic calendar: 267 BH – 266 BH
- Javanese calendar: 245–246
- Julian calendar: 363; CCCLXIII
- Korean calendar: 2696
- Minguo calendar: 1549 before ROC 民前1549年
- Nanakshahi calendar: −1105
- Seleucid era: 674/675 AG
- Thai solar calendar: 905–906
- Tibetan calendar: ཆུ་ཕོ་ཁྱི་ལོ་ (male Water-Dog); 489 or 108 or −664 — to — ཆུ་མོ་ཕག་ལོ་ (female Water-Boar); 490 or 109 or −663

Campaign of Emperor Julian against the Persian Empire (363)

Year 363 (CCCLXIII) was a common year starting on Wednesday of the Julian calendar. At the time, it was known in Rome as the Year of the Consulship of Iulianus and Sallustius (or, less frequently, year 1116 Ab urbe condita). The denomination 363 for this year has been used since the early medieval period, when the Anno Domini calendar era became the prevalent method in Europe for naming years.

== Events ==
=== By place ===
==== Roman Empire ====
* March? Emperor Julian officially orders the restoration and rebuilding of the Jewish Temple in Jerusalem. https://cojs.org/julian-the-apostate-plan-to-rebuild-temple/

- March 5 – Emperor Julian departs from Antioch with his army (90,000 men) and heads north towards the Euphrates. En route he creates a diversion and sends a force of 30,000 soldiers under his cousin Procopius to Armenia.
- April – Julian crosses the Euphrates near Hierapolis, using 50 pontoon ships, and moves eastwards to Carrhae. He destroys Perisapora and overruns Persian forts along the desert frontier (Limes Arabicus).
- May 29 – Battle of Ctesiphon: Julian reaches the vicinity of the strongly fortified capital Ctesiphon. King Shapur II in charge of a large Persian army adopts a scorched earth policy, leaving the Romans desperately short of supplies.
- June 16 – The Roman army starts its retreat northward to Corduene (Armenia). Julian marches back up the Tigris and burns his fleet of supply ships. During the withdrawal Julian's forces suffer several attacks from the Persians.
- June 26 – Battle of Samarra: Julian is mortally wounded in a skirmish and dies from a wound received during the fighting near Samarra (Iraq). Jovian, general of the Guard, succeeds him and is proclaimed Emperor by the troops.. The project to rebuild the Jewish Temple is permanently abandoned.
- Emperor Jovian negotiates a disastrous peace with Persia, surrendering four of the five Roman provinces gained by Caesar Galerius in 298, and the cities Nisibis and Singara (Mesopotamia).

==== Egypt ====
- Egyptian rose in revolt against Roman occupation, armed clashes occur.

==== Europe ====
- The Huns first appear in Europe and reach the Caspian Sea.

==== Middle East ====
- May 18–19 – Galilee earthquake of 363. Petra, capital of the Nabataeans (in modern-day Jordan), is seriously damaged.
- 363 Arsakawan earthquake: It affects the cities of Arsakawan (modern Doğubayazıt) and Salat (modern Sisian).

=== By topic ===
==== Astronomy ====
- April 20 – The planet Venus occults the planet Jupiter.

==== Religion ====
- The Council of Laodicea, which deals with constricting the conduct of church members, is held. The major canon approved by this council is Canon 29, which prohibits resting on the Sabbath (Saturday), restricting Christians to honoring the Lord on Sunday.
- Mar Mattai Monastery is founded on Mount Alfaf.

== Births ==
- Sulpicius Severus, Christian writer (approximate date)
- Wu Di (or Liu Yu), Chinese emperor of Liu Song (d. 422)

== Deaths ==
- June 26 – Julian the Apostate, Roman emperor (b. 331)
- Aemilia Hilaria, Galo-Roman physician and writer (b. 300)
- Lucillianus, Roman commander (magister equitum)
- Zhang Xuanjing, Chinese ruler of Former Liang (b. 350)
- Zhou (or Cheng), Chinese concubine of Jin Chengdi

== Sources ==
- Guidoboni, Emanuela; Traina, Giusto (1995), "A new catalogue of earthquakes in the historical Armenian area from antiquity to the 12th century", Annals of Geophysics, 38, doi:10.4401/ag-4134
