= Gemellus of Ancyra =

Saint Gemellus
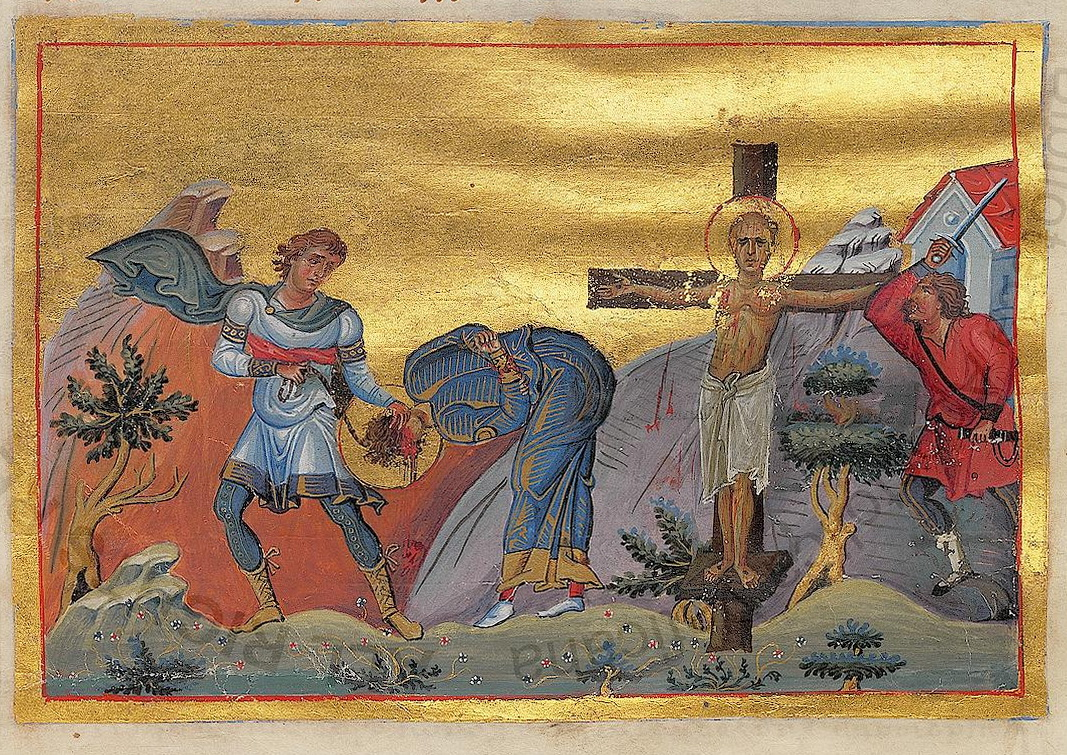
- Martyrdom of St. Gemellus. From the Menologion of Basil II.

Martyr
- Died: 362 AD; Ancyra or Edessa
- Feast: December 10

Saint Gemellus of Ancyra (Greek: Γέμελλος) is venerated as a Christian martyr and saint. According to tradition, he was martyred by crucifixion at Ancyra (present-day Ankara), in Asia Minor, during the reign of Julian the Apostate.

He was a native of Paphlagonia.

He is said to be the last Christian martyr who was killed by crucifixion. Hearing that the Emperor Julian was at Ancyra, Gemellus had traveled there to criticize the emperor for his apostasy, and was tortured and killed at Ancyra (or, according to one source, at Edessa).

A church dedicated to Saint Gemellus was located at Sykeon, a village on the Siberis River in Asia Minor.
