= 343 =

343 in various calendars
Gregorian calendar	343; CCCXLIII
Ab urbe condita	1096
Assyrian calendar	5093
Balinese saka calendar	264–265
Bengali calendar	−251 – −250
Berber calendar	1293
Buddhist calendar	887
Burmese calendar	−295
Byzantine calendar	5851–5852
Chinese calendar	壬寅年 (Water Tiger); 3040 or 2833 — to — 癸卯年 (Water Rabbit); 3041 or 2834
Coptic calendar	59–60
Discordian calendar	1509
Ethiopian calendar	335–336
Hebrew calendar	4103–4104
- Hindu calendars
Vikram Samvat	399–400
Shaka Samvat	264–265
Kali Yuga	3443–3444
Holocene calendar	10343
Iranian calendar	279 BP – 278 BP
Islamic calendar	288 BH – 287 BH
Javanese calendar	224–225
Julian calendar	343; CCCXLIII
Korean calendar	2676
Minguo calendar	1569 before ROC 民前1569年
Nanakshahi calendar	−1125
Seleucid era	654/655 AG
Thai solar calendar	885–886
Tibetan calendar	ཆུ་ཕོ་སྟག་ལོ་ (male Water-Tiger); 469 or 88 or −684 — to — ཆུ་མོ་ཡོས་ལོ་ (female Water-Hare); 470 or 89 or −683

Year 343 (CCCXLIII) was a common year starting on Saturday of the Julian calendar. At the time, it was known as the Year of the Consulship of Memmius and Romulus (or, less frequently, year 1096 Ab urbe condita). The denomination 343 for this year has been used since the early medieval period, when the Anno Domini calendar era became the prevalent method in Europe for naming years.

== Events ==
=== By place ===
==== Roman Empire ====
- The Western Roman Emperor Constans I is in Britain, possibly in a military campaign against the Picts and Scots (the last visit to Britain by a legitimate emperor).
- The Eastern Roman Emperor Constantius II campaigns in Adiabene, a vassal kingdom of Armenia (Persian Empire).

=== By topic ===
==== Religion ====
- Pope Julius I tries to unite the Western bishops against Arianism by convoking the Council of Serdica, which acknowledges the pope's supreme authority and grants him the right to judge cases involving the legal possession of episcopal sees, but only Western and Egyptian bishops attend, and Arianism remains strong.

== Births ==
- Fu Deng, Chinese emperor of the Di state Former Qin (d. 394)
- Jin Mudi, Chinese emperor of the Eastern Jin Dynasty (d. 361)
- Xiao Wenshou (or Xiaoyi), Chinese empress dowager (d. 423)
- Xie Xuan, Chinese general of the Jin Dynasty (d. 388)

== Deaths ==
- December 6 – Saint Nicholas (or Santa Claus) (b. 270)
- Li Shou (or Wukao), Chinese emperor of Cheng Han (b. 300)
