= Huiguo (nun) =

Chinese Buddhist nun (364–433)

Huiguo (Chinese: 慧果; 364 – 433) was a Chinese Buddhist nun.

Women first became Buddhist nuns in China in the 4th century, Zhu Jingjian in 317 often being referred to as the first, however, they were not fully ordained in the vinaya tradition and thus formally regarded as novices even though they did live and functioned as nuns in practice, while the Buddhist monks in China were ordained. Because of this, Huiguo played a major pioneer role when she became the first woman in China to be fully ordained as a nun and an abbess.

As was the custom for nuns in China of the time, Huiguo lived as a de facto nun for decades without being ordained, and was able to found a nunnery with the support of the Governor of Shandong, becoming its abbess. However, it was her ambition to introduce the custom to ordain women formally as nuns in China, as monks were.

In 429, China received a group of Buddhist monks and nuns from Sri Lanka, and she welcomed the nuns in her convent. These nuns were fully ordained. The following years, she negotiated with the monks about religious assistance and lobbied to have nuns in China ordained. In 433, she achieved her goal and became the first nun as well as the first abbess in China who was formally ordained as such, followed by a number of other pioneer nun, among them the famous Senjing, and thus, nuns were fully acknowledged in China as the monks. Huiguo died later that same year.
