= 363 Arsakawan earthquake =

363 earthquake affecting the cities of cities of Arsakawan and Salat

Coordinates: 39°30′N 44°06′E

The 363 Arsakawan earthquake took place c. 363. It affected the cities of Arsakawan (modern Doğubayazıt in eastern Turkey) and Salat (modern Sisian in Armenia).

The earthquake is described in the hagiography The Life of Saint Nerses (8th century). The narrative describes the destruction of the city of Arsakawan, which had been constructed by the king Arshak II (reigned 350–368). All the inhabitants were reportedly crushed by the city's collapse. All that was left of the city were "wood and stone debris".

Other Armenian sources speak of the city's destruction, without mentioning the earthquake. They attribute the city's destruction to a plague.

The historian Stephen Orbelian (13th century) connects this earthquake to a military campaign of the king Shapur II (reigned 309–379) against the Armenian province of Siwnik' (modern Syunik Province). In Orbelian's narrative, Persian slaves of Shapur were scaling an artificial hill, in an attempt to reach the church of Salat. Then the earthquake occurred, and the Persians were thrown aside. Those who had climbed to the top of the hill were killed by the earthquake.

Orbelian's narrative reports that the church of Salat was buried by the earthquake, along with all its treasures. But that it was later rediscovered. Following another earthquake, further relics of this lost church were reportedly discovered. The more recent earthquake had detached the stones of a chapel, leading to the discovery. An "odorous emanation" was released by this second earthquake, according to Orbelian.

The historian Movses Dasxuranci (10th to 11th century) gives a similar report on the earthquake. It describes the Sasanian Army climbing a mound to reach the church of Salat. The earthquake reportedly took place when they had reached the top of the mound. The army fled in fear of the earthquake, along with their general At'askoday.

The historian Josef Markwart (20th century) theorized that this earthquake was identical to the 358 earthquake that affected Nicomedia (modern İzmit). However, this identification is not confirmed by primary sources.

== Sources ==
- Guidoboni, Emanuela; Traina, Giusto (1995), "A new catalogue of earthquakes in the historical Armenian area from antiquity to the 12th century", Annals of Geophysics, 38 (1), doi:10.4401/ag-4134, ISSN 2037-416X
