= Maternien =

French Roman Catholic saint

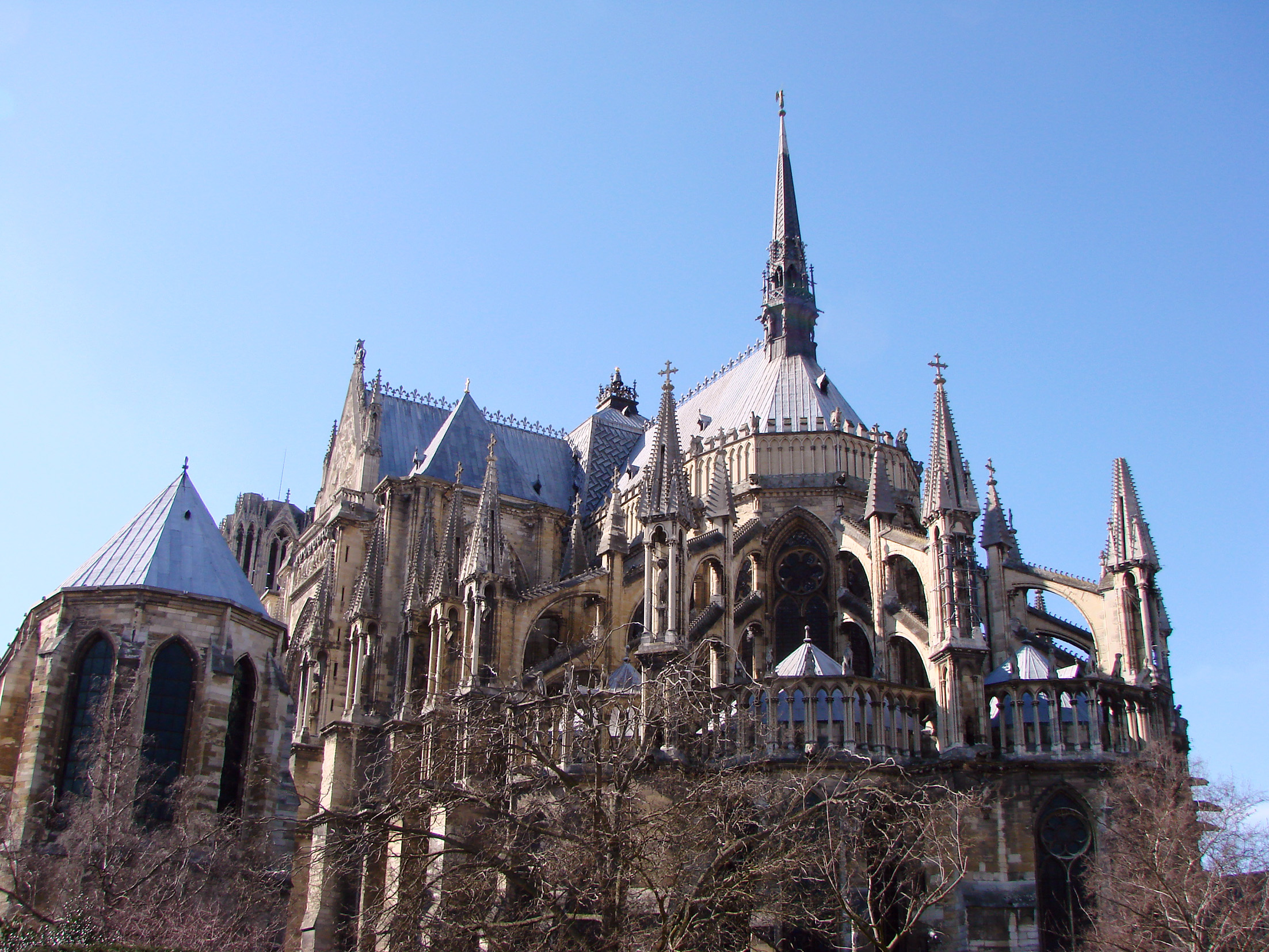
Exterior view of the Reims Cathedralchevet.

St. Maternien (died 368), was 4th century French Bishop of Reims, saint and confessor. His feast day is 30 April.

Maternien, was the brother of St Materne the Bishop of Milan(Feast day on 18 July) and was Bishop of Reims from 348 to 359AD. He died July 7, 368.

His relics were given by Archbishop Hincmar to Louis I, Count of Flanders.
