= Maximus of Naples =

4th-century Christian bishop, martyr, and saint

Saint Maximus
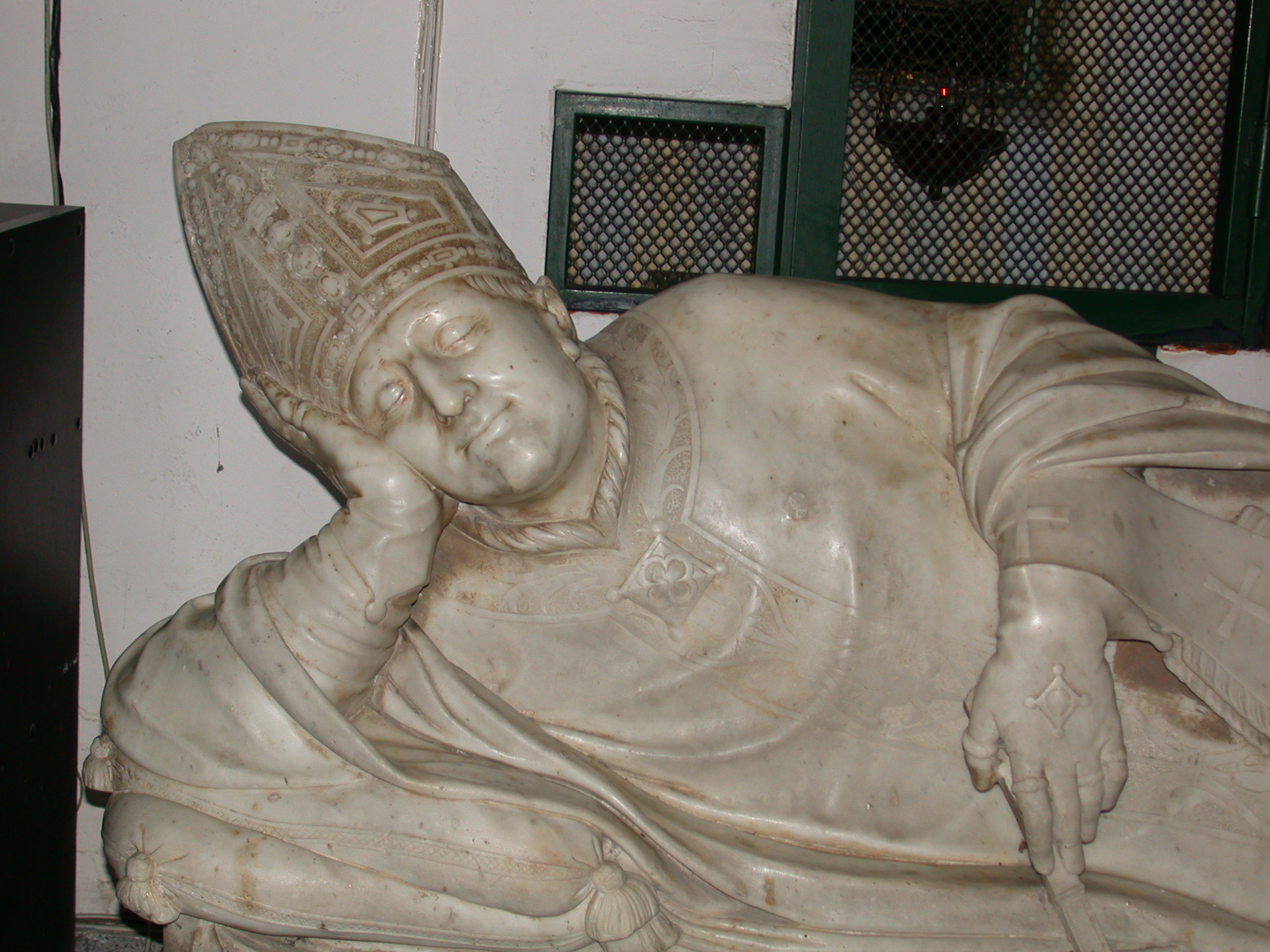
- Statue of Maximus of Naples

Martyr, Confessor and Bishop of Naples
- Died: 361
- Venerated in: Roman Catholic Church, Eastern Orthodox Church
- Canonized: Pre-congregation
- Major shrine: Naples Cathedral, Naples, Italy relics in Chiesa di Sant'Eframo Vecchio, Naples, Italy
- Feast: 10 June Roman Catholic 23 June Eastern Orthodox

Saint Maximus (died 361 AD) was Bishop of Naples, who was sent into exile. Maximus was known as a great defender of the decrees of the Council of Nicaea, especially with the opposition to Arianism. This led to his exile, and being replaced as Bishop of Naples, by Zosimos, who proclaimed the Arianistic doctrine. A well known legend states that each time Zosimos wanted to speak in public, his words would not come out. Many attributed this as a miracle, through the prayers of the exiled Maximus. He would be martyred in exile.
