= George of Cappadocia =

Patriarch of Alexandria from 356 to 361

George of Cappadocia (Greek: Γεώργιος ό Καππάδοκης, died 24 December 361) was the intruding Arian bishop of Alexandria from 356 until his assassination. He was in post during the third exile of Bishop Athanasius.

George was appointed as bishop by the Emperor Constantius II in 357; after the emperor’s death, the people of the city turned against George and murdered him and his officers (Diodorus and Dracontius) in 361.

== Biography ==
=== Early life ===
George was born, according to Ammianus Marcellinus, at Epiphania in Cilicia, and, if so, must have been Greek Cappadocian only by descent. (The name "of Cappadocia" by which he is commonly known comes from Athan. Ep. ad Episc. 7.) Gregory Nazianzen describes him as not purely free-born, and as "unlearned," but he undoubtedly collected a library which Julian, no bad judge, describes as "very large and ample," richly stored with philosophical, rhetorical, and historical authors, and with various works of "Galilean" or Christian theology.

=== Intrusion ===
In February 356, after Athanasius had retired from Alexandria in consequence of the attack on his church, which all but ended in his seizure, he heard that George was to be intruded into his throne, as Gregory had been sixteen years previously. George arrived in Alexandria, escorted by soldiers, during Lent 356. His installation was a signal for new inflictions on Alexandrian church-people. "After Easter week," says Athanasius, "virgins were imprisoned, bishops led away in chains"; "attacks made on houses"; and on the first Sunday evening after Pentecost a number of people who had met for prayer in a secluded place were cruelly maltreated by the commander, Sebastian, a "pitiless Manichaean," for refusing to communicate with George.

The intruding bishop was a man of resolution and action. Gregory of Nazianzus, who disparages his abilities, admits that he was like a "hand" to the Arians, while he employed an eloquent prelate - probably Acacius - as a "tongue." He belonged to the Acacian section of the party, and was consequently obnoxious to the semi-Arians, who "deposed him" in the council of Seleucia. He allowed the notorious adventurer Aetius, founder of the Anomoeans or ultra-Arians, to officiate as deacon at Alexandria, after having been ordained, as Athanasius tells us, by Leontius of Antioch, although he afterwards "compelled" the Arian bishops of Egypt to sign the decree of the Acacian synod of Constantinople of 360 against Aetius. He induced Theodore, bishop of Oxyrynchus, to submit to degradation from the ministry and to be reordained by him as an Arian bishop. He managed to keep the confidence of Constantius, who congratulated the Alexandrians on having abandoned such "grovelling teachers" as Athanasius and entrusted their "heavenward aspirations" to the guidance of "the most venerable George". But George was far from recommending his form of Christianity either to the orthodox or to the pagans of Alexandria. "He was severe," says Sozomen, "to the adherents of Athanasius", not only forbidding the exercise of their worship, but "inflicting imprisonment and scourges on men and women after the fashion of a tyrant"; while, towards all alike, "he wielded his authority with more violence than belonged to the episcopal rank and character." He was "hated by the magistrates for his supercilious demeanour, by the people for his tyranny". He stood well with Constantius, who was guided theologically by the Acacians; and it was easy for the "pope" of Alexandria to embitter his sovereign (as Julian says he did,) against the Alexandrian community, to name several of its members as disobedient subjects, and to suggest that its grand public buildings ought by rights to pay tax to the treasury. He showed himself a keen man of business, "buying up the nitre-works, the marshes of papyrus and reed, and the salt lakes". He manifested his anti-pagan zeal by arbitrary acts and insulting speeches, procured the banishment of Zeno, a prominent pagan physician, prevented the pagans from offering sacrifices and celebrating their national feasts, brought Artemius, "duke" of Egypt, much given to the destruction of idols, with an armed force into the superb temple of Serapis at Alexandria, which was forthwith stripped of images, votive offerings, and ornaments

On 29 August 358, the people broke into the church of St. Dionysius, where George was then residing, and the soldiers rescued him from their hands with difficulty and after hard fighting. On 2 October he was obliged to leave the city; and the "Athanasians" occupied the churches from 11 October to 24 December, when they were again ejected by Sebastian. Probably George returned soon after he had quitted the Seleucian council, i.e. in November 359. The news of Julian's accession arrived at Alexandria 30 November 361. George was in the height of his pride and power: he had persecuted and mocked the pagans who now, being officially informed that there was an emperor who worshipped the gods, felt that the gods could at last be avenged. The shout arose, "Away with George!" and "in a moment," says the Fragmentist, they threw him into prison, with Diodorus and Dracontius, the master of the mint, who had overthrown a pagan altar which he found standing there. The captives were kept in irons until the morning of 24 December. Then the pagan mob again assembled, dragged them forth with "horrible shouts" of triumph, and kicked them to death. They flung the mangled body of George on a camel, which they led through every part of the city, dragging the two other corpses along with ropes, and eventually burned the remains on the shore, casting the ashes into the sea.

=== Legacy ===
The Arians regarded George as a martyr; and Edward Gibbon took an evident pleasure in representing "the renowned St. George of England" as the Alexandrian usurper "transformed" into a heroic soldier-saint. However, Bishop Milner and others have shown that this assumption of identity is manifestly false, the St. George who is patron saint of England being of an earlier date, though of that saint's life, country, or date we have no certain information.

None of his writings have survived.
