= Jingjian =

Chinese Buddhist nun (292–361)

Zhu Jingjian
- 竺敬簡
- Born: 292
- Died: 361
- Occupations: Buddhist teacher, pioneering novice nun
- Known for: Considered the first Buddhist nun (de facto) in China

Zhu Jingjian (Chinese: 竺淨檢; 292–361) was a Chinese Buddhist nun, referred to as the first nun in China.

After having been widowed, she was active as a teacher in Luoyang. She became interested in Buddhism, and was instructed in the subject by the monk Fashi. In this time there were monks, but no nuns, in China. However, she, and a couple of other women after her, became learned in Buddhism and started to live as de facto nuns. In 357, she made her vows and from that year onward, she was referred to as a nun and as such a pioneer. She has been called the first Buddhist nun in China. However, as she and the nuns that followed during the 4th century was never formally ordained in accordance to the vinaya ritual, they were formally known as novices rather than fully ordained nuns, and it was not until Huiguo in the following century that nuns in China was formally recognized as such.
