= 330s =

Decade

The 330s decade ran from January 1, 330, to December 31, 339.

== Events ==
=== By place ===
==== Roman Empire ====
- May 11 – Emperor Constantine the Great dedicates the Column of Constantine and Constantinople, or Nova Roma (modern-day Istanbul). He had spent four years expanding the city of Byzantium, having chosen the site for its strategic location on the Bosporus. The city is later the capital of the Eastern Roman Empire.
- The Goths devastate the city of Tanais, in the Don River Delta.

==== Africa ====
- Ezana, king of Axum, extends his area of control to the west. He defeats the Nobates, and destroys the kingdom of Meroë.

=== By topic ===
==== Religion ====
- Frumentius is the first bishop of Ethiopia (approximate date).
- Eustathius, Patriarch of Antioch, is banished to Trajanopolis.
- The Bible is translated into the Gothic language by Wulfila.
- Pagan temples begin to be progressively abandoned, destroyed or left to fall into disrepair, save those that are transformed into churches.

=== By place ===
==== Roman Empire ====
- Emperor Constantine the Great vigorously promotes Christianity, confiscating the property and valuables of a number of pagan temples throughout the Roman Empire.
- Constantine I dedicates the Church of the Holy Apostles in Constantinople.
- Constantine I promulgates a law against divorce.

==== Asia ====
- Gogugwon becomes ruler of the Korean kingdom of Goguryeo.

=== By topic ===
==== Art and Science ====
- Eusebius of Caesarea writes the Onomasticon.

==== Religion ====
- The Fifty Bibles of Constantine are commissioned for use in Constantinople.
- Gregory the Illuminator withdraws to a small sanctuary in the Daranali province (Armenia).

=== By place ===
==== Roman Empire ====
- Emperor Constantine I and his son Constantine II, aged 16, defeat the Goths in Moesia. The Goths become Roman allies and protect the Danube frontier.
- Constantine I continues construction of a bridge (in imitation of Trajan and his architect Apollodorus of Damascus) across the Danube, for forward-staging grounds for planned campaigns against local tribes.
- May 18 – Constantine I announces a free distribution of food to the citizens in Constantinople, similar to the food given out in the city of Rome. The amount is approximately 80,000 rations a day, doled out from 117 distribution points around the city.

=== By place ===
==== Roman Empire ====
- Flavius Dalmatius and Domitius Zenofilus are appointed consuls.
- Emperor Constantine the Great pulls Roman troops out of Britain, and abandons work on Hadrian's Wall.
- Calocaerus revolts against Constantine I and proclaims himself emperor. Flavius Dalmatius, responsible for the security of the eastern frontier, is sent to Cyprus to suppress the rebellion.
- December 25 – Constantine I elevates his youngest son Constans to the rank of Caesar at Constantinople.

==== China ====
- Shi Hong succeeds his father Shi Le as Emperor of the Later Zhao Empire, in the Period of the Sixteen Kingdoms, but Shi Hong's third cousin Shi Hu holds the real power. Empress Dowager Liu (widow of Shi Le) fails to get rid of Shi Hu, and Shi Hu has her deposed and killed.

=== By place ===
==== Roman Empire ====
- Flavius Dalmatius puts down a revolt in Cyprus, led by Calocaerus. Calocaerus is brought to Tarsus (Cilicia), and executed.
- The Goths protect the Danube frontier against an invasion by the Vandals.
- Emperor Constantine the Great reauthorises gladiatorial combat.

=== By place ===
==== Roman Empire ====
- September 14 – Emperor Constantine I consecrates the Church of the Holy Sepulchre in Jerusalem.
- September 19 – Flavius Dalmatius is raised to the rank of Caesar, with control of Thracia, Achaia, and Macedonia.
- Hannibalianus, nephew of Constantine I, is made Rex Regum ("King of Kings of the Pontic people").
- November 7 – Athanasius is banished to Trier, on the charge that he prevented the grain fleet from sailing to Constantinople.

==== Asia ====
- Samudragupta succeeds Chandragupta I as king of the Gupta Empire.
- Tuoba Hena ousts Tuoba Yihuai as chieftain of the Tuoba Clan.
- Emperor Shi Hu moves the capital of the Later Zhao state to Yecheng.

=== By topic ===
==== Religion ====
- First Synod of Tyre: Constantine I convenes a gathering of bishops at Tyre to depose and exile Patriarch Athanasius of Alexandria.
- Constantine I reinstates the Alexandrian priest Arius (declared a heretic at the First Council of Nicaea in 325) in a synod at Jerusalem about a year before Arius' death.
- September 13 – The Church of the Holy Sepulchre in Jerusalem is consecrated.
- December 31 – Pope Sylvester I dies at Rome after a 21-year reign. He is succeeded by Mark as the 34th pope.

=== By place ===
==== Roman Empire ====
- The military successes of Emperor Constantine I result in most of Dacia being reconquered by the Roman Empire.
- The first recorded customs tariff is in use in Palmyra.

=== By topic ===
==== Religion ====
- January 18 – Pope Mark succeeds Pope Sylvester I as the 34th pope of the Catholic Church.
- Pope Mark begins to build the basilica of San Marco; the church is devoted to St. Mark.
- Arius, Alexandrian priest, collapses in the street in Constantinople (approximate date).
- Pope Mark dies at Rome, after an 11-month reign. No successor is immediately found.
- December 25 – The first celebration of Christmas is recorded.

=== By place ===
==== Roman Empire ====
- May 22 – Constantine the Great, first Christian Roman emperor of the Western Empire (312–324), and of the Roman Empire (324–337), dies in Achyron, near Nicomedia, at age 65, after he is baptized by Eusebius of Nicomedia.
- A number of descendants of Constantius Chlorus, and officials of the Roman Empire, are executed in a purge.
- September 9 – Constantine II, Constantius II, and Constans succeed their father Constantine I as co-emperors. The Roman Empire is divided between the three Augusti.

==== Persia ====
- King Shapur II of Persia begins a war against the Roman Empire. He sends his troops across the Tigris to recover Armenia and Mesopotamia.
- Shapur II besieges the Roman fortress of Nisibis (Syria), but is repulsed by forces under Lucilianus.

==== China ====
- Murong Huang claims the title of Prince of Yan, effectively beginning the kingdom of Former Yan.

=== By topic ===
==== Religion ====
- February 6 – A 4-month papal vacancy ends; Pope Julius I succeeds Pope Mark, as the 35th pope.
- June 17 – Constantius II announces the restoration of Athanasius, as Patriarch of Alexandria.
- Paul I becomes Patriarch of Constantinople.
- Christianity is declared an official religion in Caucasian Iberia, marking the rise of Christianity in Georgia.

=== By place ===
==== Roman Empire ====
- The Romans, allied with the Goths, arrive in the north of the Roman Empire to protect the Danube frontier.
- Emperor Constantius II intervenes against the Persians in Armenia.

==== Persia ====
- Shapur II, king of the Persian Empire, begins a widespread persecution of Christians. He orders forcible conversions to the state religion, Zoroastrianism, lest the Christians disrupt his realm while he is away fighting the Romans in Armenia and Mesopotamia.

==== Asia ====
- Tuoba Yihuai, ruler of the Tuoba Dai clan, dies and is succeeded by his brother Tuoba Shiyiqian.

=== By topic ===
==== Art ====
- The Church of Santa Costanza, Rome, starts to be built (approximate date).

==== Religion ====
- Eusebius of Nicomedia becomes Patriarch of Constantinople, after Paul I is banished.
- Non-Christians are persecuted by the Roman Empire as pagans.

=== By place ===
==== Roman Empire ====
- Emperor Constantius II hastens to his territory in the East, where a revived Persia under King Shapur II is attacking Mesopotamia. For the next 11 years, the two powers engage in a war of border skirmishing, with no real victor.

=== By topic ===
==== Religion ====
- Pope Julius I gives refuge in Rome to the Alexandrian patriarch Athanasius, who is deposed and expelled during the First Synod of Tyre (see 335).
- Eusebius of Nicomedia is made bishop of Constantinople, while another Arian succeeds Athanasius as bishop of Alexandria, under the name Gregory.

== Significant people ==
- Constantine I
- Constantine II
- Constantius II
- Constans

== Births ==
330

- Ammianus Marcellinus, Graeco-Roman historian (approximate date)
- Basil the Great, bishop of Caesarea Mazaca (d. 379)
- Macrina the Younger, Christian nun and saint (d. 379)
- Moses the Black, Christian monk and priest (d. 405)
- Victricius, Christian missionary and bishop of Rouen (d. c. 407)
- Yang Xi, Chinese scholar and calligrapher (d. 386)

331

- Jovian, Roman consul and emperor (d. 364)
- (or 332) Julian the Apostate, Roman emperor (d. 363)
- Yao Chang, Chinese emperor of the Qiang state (d. 394)
- Yao Xiang (or Jingguo), Chinese warlord (d. 357)

332

- Saint Monica, Christian saint and mother of Augustine of Hippo (d. 387)

333

- Saint Monica, Christian saint and mother of Augustine of Hippo (approximate date)

334

- Huiyuan, Chinese Buddhist teacher and founder of Donglin Temple (d. 416)
- Sabbas the Goth, Christian reader and saint (d. 372)
- Virius Nicomachus Flavianus, Roman historian and politician (d. 394)

335

- Fu Sheng, Chinese emperor of the Di state Former Qin (d. 357)
- Gregory of Nyssa, Christian bishop and saint (approximate date)
- Magnus Maximus, Western Roman emperor (approximate date)
- Theon of Alexandria, director of the Library of Alexandria (approximate date)

336

- Chi Chao (or Jingyu), Chinese advisor and politician (d. 377)
- Murong De, Chinese emperor of the Xianbei state (d. 405)
- Richū, emperor of Japan (approximate date)

337

- Faxian, Chinese Buddhist monk, traveler (approximate date)
- Fú Jiān, emperor of the Chinese Di state Former Qin (d. 385)
- Lü Guang, founding emperor of the Di state Later Liang (d. 400)
- Zenobius of Florence, Italian bishop and wonderworker (d. 417)

338

- Isaac the Great, Armenian catholicos (d. 439)

339

- Aurelius Ambrosius, Italian bishop and theologian (d. 397)
- He Fani, Chinese empress of the Jin Dynasty (d. 404)
- Shi Shi, Chinese emperor of Later Zhao (d. 349)

== Deaths ==
330

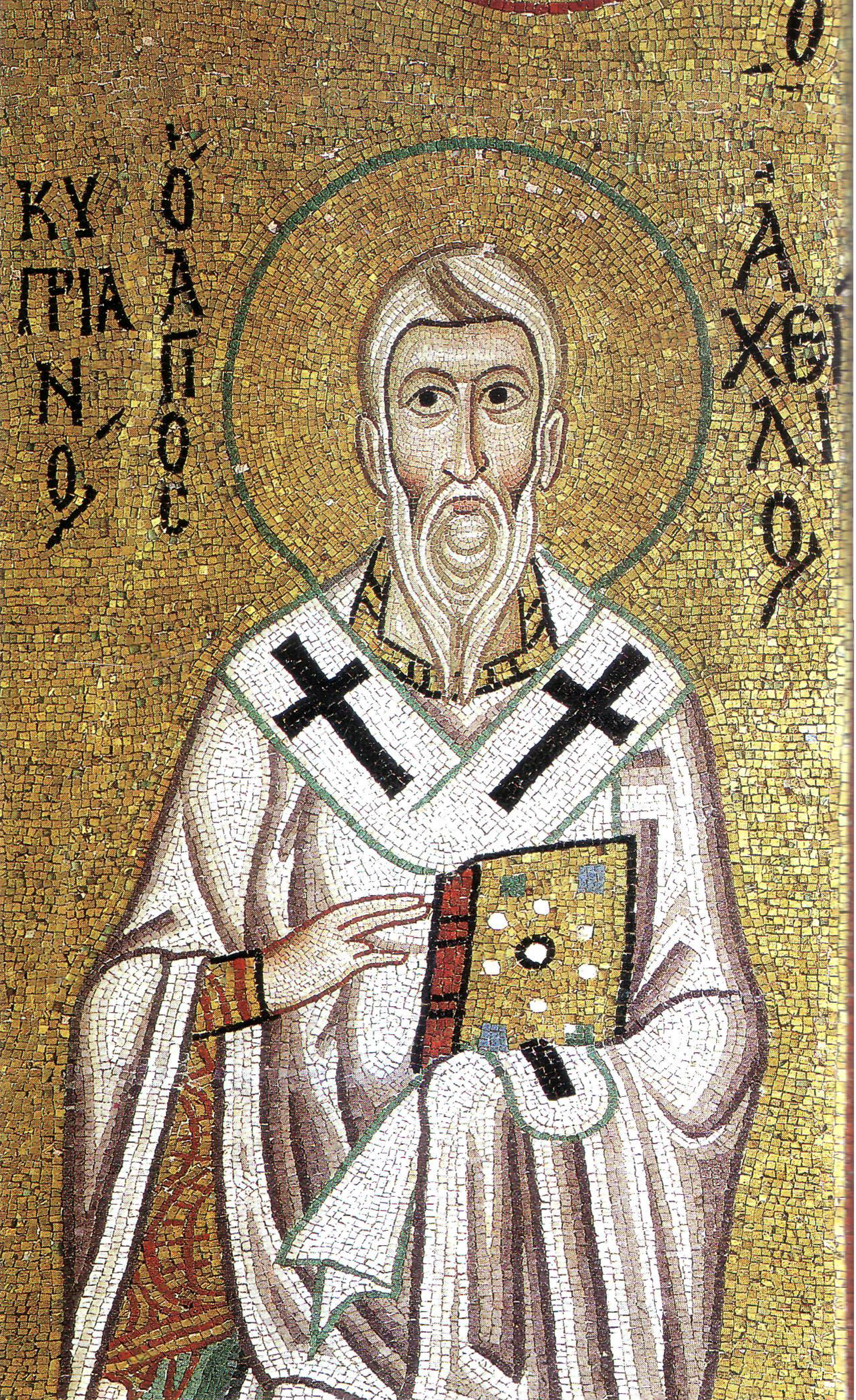
Saint Achillius of Larissa

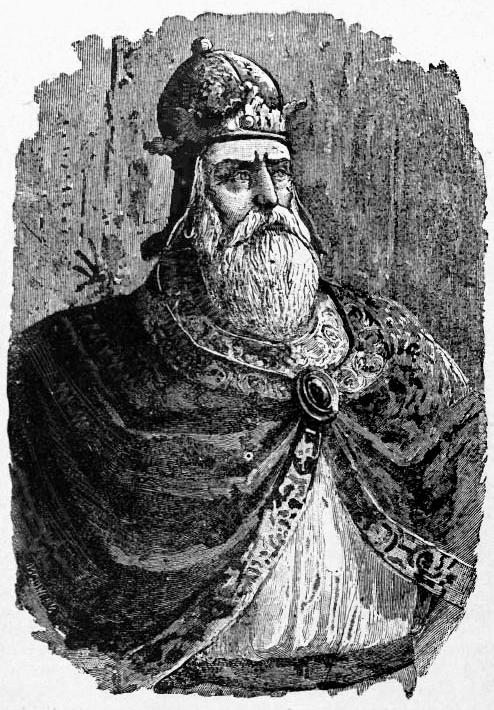
Saint Tiridates III

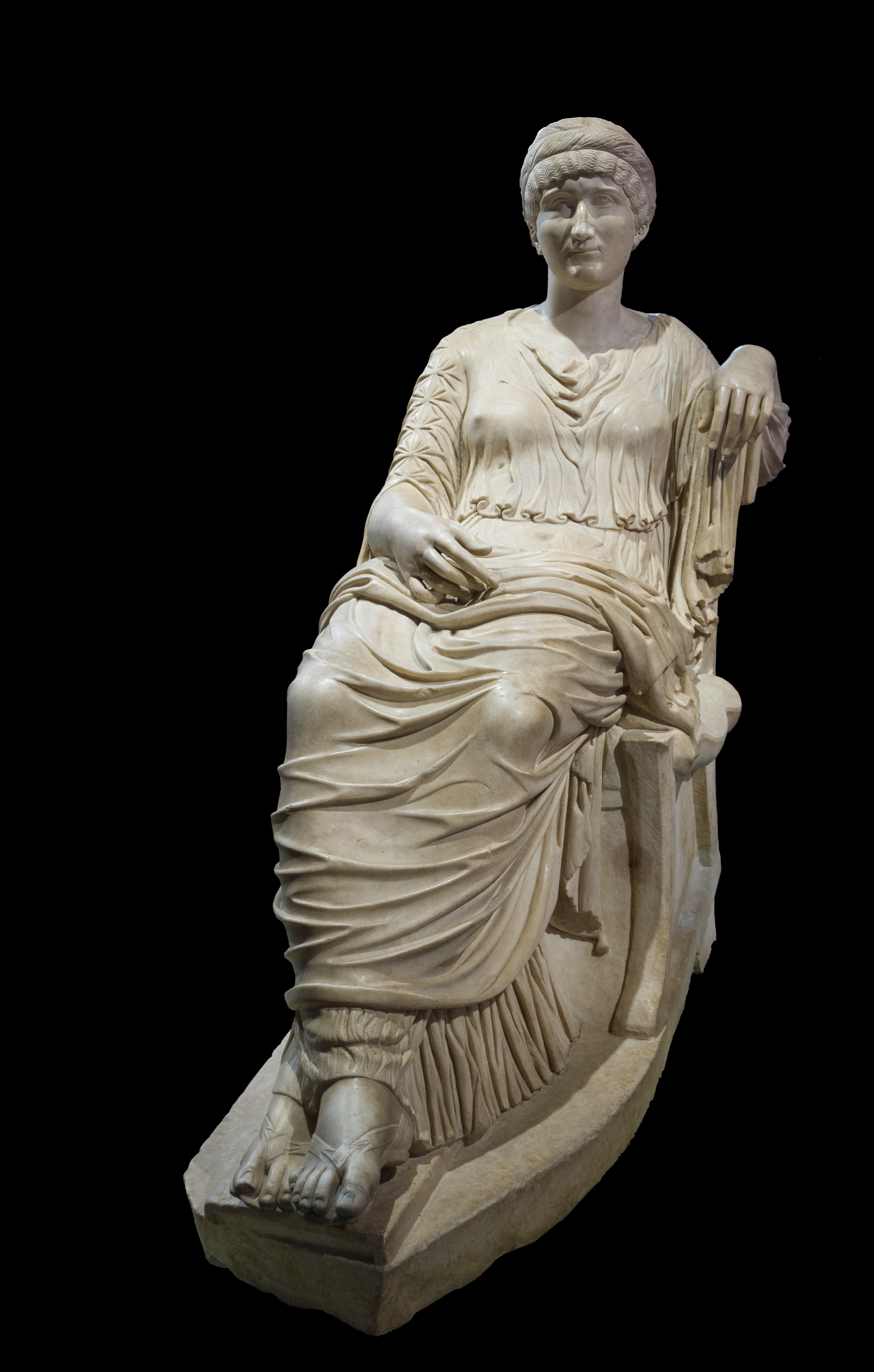
Saint Helena

- Achillius of Larissa (or Achilles), Greek bishop
- Arnobius, Numidian apologist and writer
- Guo Mo, Chinese general and warlord
- Helena (Augusta), mother of Constantine I
- Tiridates III ("the Great"), king of Armenia
- Vicinius of Sarsina, Italian Christian bishop
- Zu Yue, Chinese general and warlord

331

- Gregory the Illuminator, official head of the Armenian Apostolic Church
- Micheon of Goguryeo, Korean ruler of Goguryeo

332

- Basilina, wife of Julius Constantius and the mother of Roman Emperor Julian

333

- Cheng Xia, Chinese official and politician
- Liu, Chinese empress of the Jie State (or Later Zhao)
- Murong Hui, Chinese chieftain and duke of Liaodong (b. 269)
- Shi Le, Chinese founder and emperor of the Jie State (b. 274)
- Xu Guang (or Jiwu), Chinese official, politician and adviser

334

- December 5 – Li Ban, Chinese emperor of Cheng-Han (b. 288)
- Calocaerus, Roman usurper
- Li Xiong, Chinese emperor of Cheng-Han (b. 274)
- Shi Hong, Chinese emperor of the Jie state (b. 313)
- Tao Kan (or Shixing), Chinese general and politician (b. 259)
- Wei Huacun (or Xianan), Chinese religious leader (b. 252)
- Yang Nandi, Chinese general and ruler of Chouchi

335

- December 31 – Sylvester I, pope of the Catholic Church (b. 285)
- Chandragupta I, Indian king of the Gupta Empire
- Cheng, Chinese empress dowager of the Later Zhao state
- Lady Xun (or Yuzhang), Chinese concubine of Yuan of Jin

336

- October 7 – Mark, pope of the Catholic Church
- Arius, Cyrenaic presbyter and priest (b. 256)
- Gan Bao (or Kan Pao), Chinese historian
- Murong Ren (or Qiannian), Chinese general

337

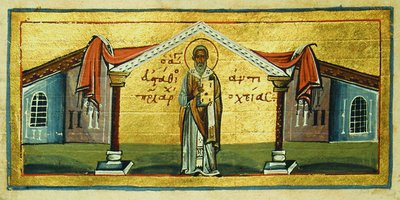
Saint Eustathius of Antioch

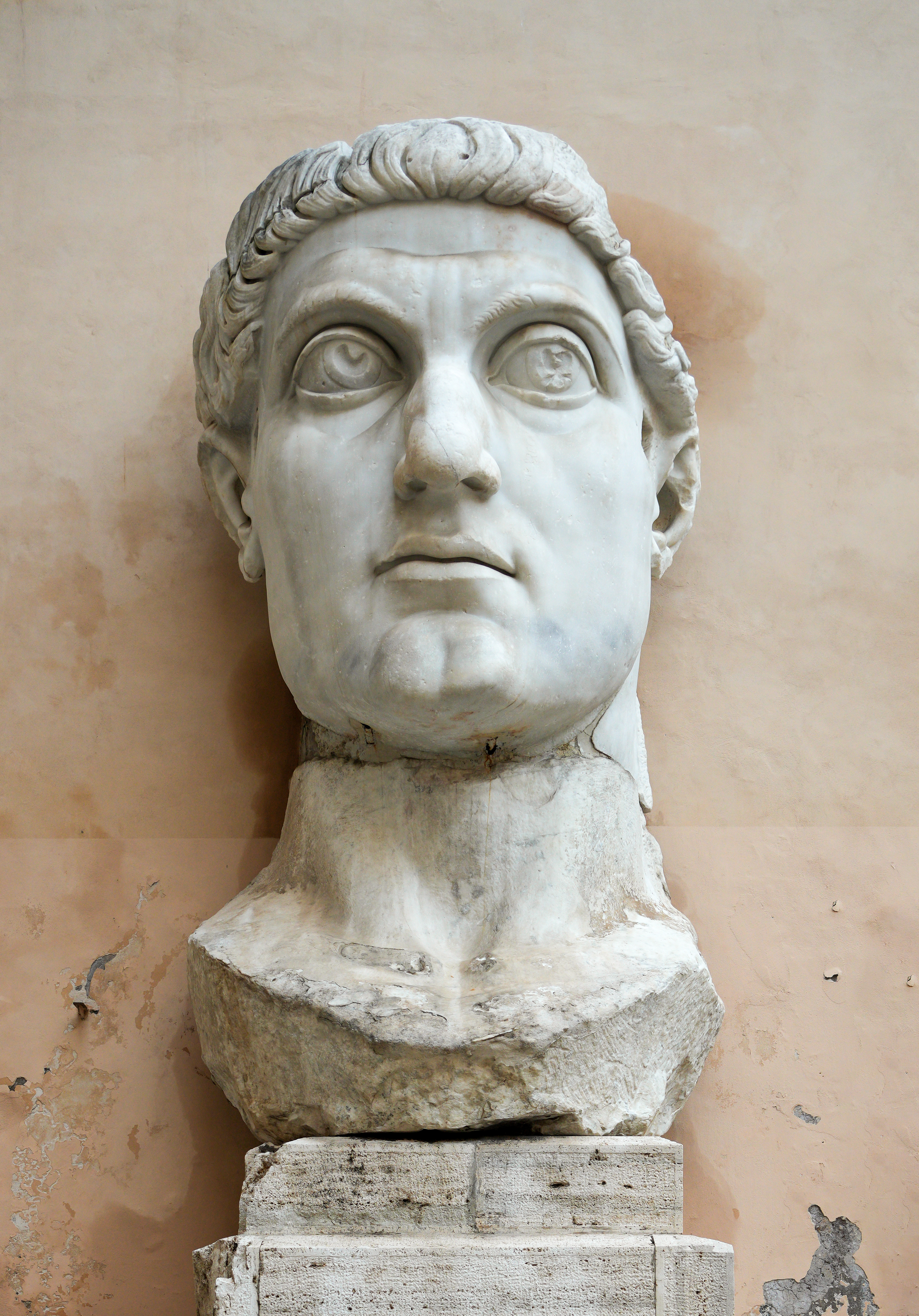
Emperor and Saint Constantine the Great

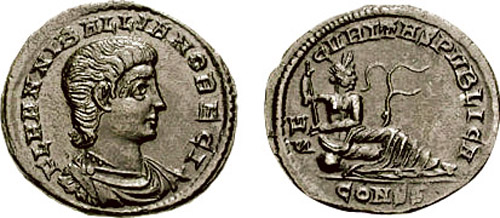
Hannibalianus

- January 13 – Leontius of Caesarea, Roman Catholic bishop and saint
- February 21 – Eustathius the Great, patriarch of Antioch (approximate date)
- May 22 – Constantine the Great, emperor of the Roman Empire, Orthodox priest and saint

Summer 337:

- Flavius Dalmatius, father of Dalmatius and Hannibalianus (executed)
- Julius Constantius, son of Constantius Chlorus (executed)
- Hannibalianus, king of the Pontus and nephew of Constantine I (executed)
- Dalmatius, Caesar and nephew of Constantine I (executed)

August:

- August 30 – Alexander of Constantinople, bishop of Byzantium (approximate date)

338

- Flavius Ablabius, Roman consul and politician
- Li Qi, Chinese emperor of Cheng Han (b. 314)
- Tuoba Yihuai, prince of the Tuoba Dai clan

339

- Abaye, Babylonian rabbi of the Jewish Talmud
- Xi Jian (or Daohui), Chinese general (b. 269)
- Duan Liao, Chinese chieftain of the Duan state (Xianbei)
- Eusebius of Caesarea, Greek bishop (approximate date).
- Khosrov III (the Small), Roman client king (approximate date)
- Wang Dao (or Maohong), Chinese politician (b. 276)
