= 333 =

333 in various calendars
- Gregorian calendar: 333; CCCXXXIII
- Ab urbe condita: 1086
- Assyrian calendar: 5083
- Balinese saka calendar: 254–255
- Bengali calendar: −261 – −260
- Berber calendar: 1283
- Buddhist calendar: 877
- Burmese calendar: −305
- Byzantine calendar: 5841–5842
- Chinese calendar: 壬辰年 (Water Dragon); 3030 or 2823 — to — 癸巳年 (Water Snake); 3031 or 2824
- Coptic calendar: 49–50
- Discordian calendar: 1499
- Ethiopian calendar: 325–326
- Hebrew calendar: 4093–4094
- Hindu calendars
- Vikram Samvat: 389–390
- Shaka Samvat: 254–255
- Kali Yuga: 3433–3434
- Holocene calendar: 10333
- Iranian calendar: 289 BP – 288 BP
- Islamic calendar: 298 BH – 297 BH
- Javanese calendar: 214–215
- Julian calendar: 333; CCCXXXIII
- Korean calendar: 2666
- Minguo calendar: 1579 before ROC 民前1579年
- Nanakshahi calendar: −1135
- Seleucid era: 644/645 AG
- Thai solar calendar: 875–876
- Tibetan calendar: ཆུ་ཕོ་འབྲུག་ལོ་ (male Water-Dragon); 459 or 78 or −694 — to — ཆུ་མོ་སྦྲུལ་ལོ་ (female Water-Snake); 460 or 79 or −693

Year 333 (CCCXXXIII) was a common year starting on Monday of the Julian calendar. At the time, it was known as the Year of the Consulship of Dalmatius and Zenophilus (or, less frequently, year 1086 Ab urbe condita). The denomination 333 for this year has been used since the early medieval period, when the Anno Domini calendar era became the prevalent method in Europe for naming years.

== Events ==
=== By place ===
==== Roman Empire ====
- Flavius Dalmatius and Domitius Zenofilus are appointed consuls.
- Emperor Constantine the Great pulls Roman troops out of Britain, and abandons work on Hadrian's Wall.
- Calocaerus revolts against Constantine I and proclaims himself emperor. Flavius Dalmatius, responsible for the security of the eastern frontier, is sent to Cyprus to suppress the rebellion.
- December 25 – Constantine I elevates his youngest son Constans to the rank of Caesar at Constantinople.

==== China ====
- Shi Hong succeeds his father Shi Le as Emperor of the Later Zhao Empire, in the Period of the Sixteen Kingdoms, but Shi Hong's third cousin Shi Hu holds the real power. Empress Dowager Liu (widow of Shi Le) fails to get rid of Shi Hu, and Shi Hu has her deposed and killed.

== Births ==
- Saint Monica, Christian saint and mother of Augustine of Hippo (approximate date)

== Deaths ==
- Cheng Xia, Chinese official and politician
- Liu, Chinese empress of the Jie State (or Later Zhao)
- Murong Hui, Chinese chieftain and duke of Liaodong (b. 269)
- Shi Le, Chinese founder and emperor of the Jie State (b. 274)
- Xu Guang (or Jiwu), Chinese official, politician and adviser
