= Chen Fei =

Chen Fei may refer to:

- Chen Fei (politician) (born 1975), Chinese politician
- Chen Fei (artist) (born 1983), Chinese artist
- Chen Fei (judoka) (born 1990), Chinese judoka

== See also ==
- Consort Chen (disambiguation)
