= List of consorts and children of Emperor Yingzong of Ming =

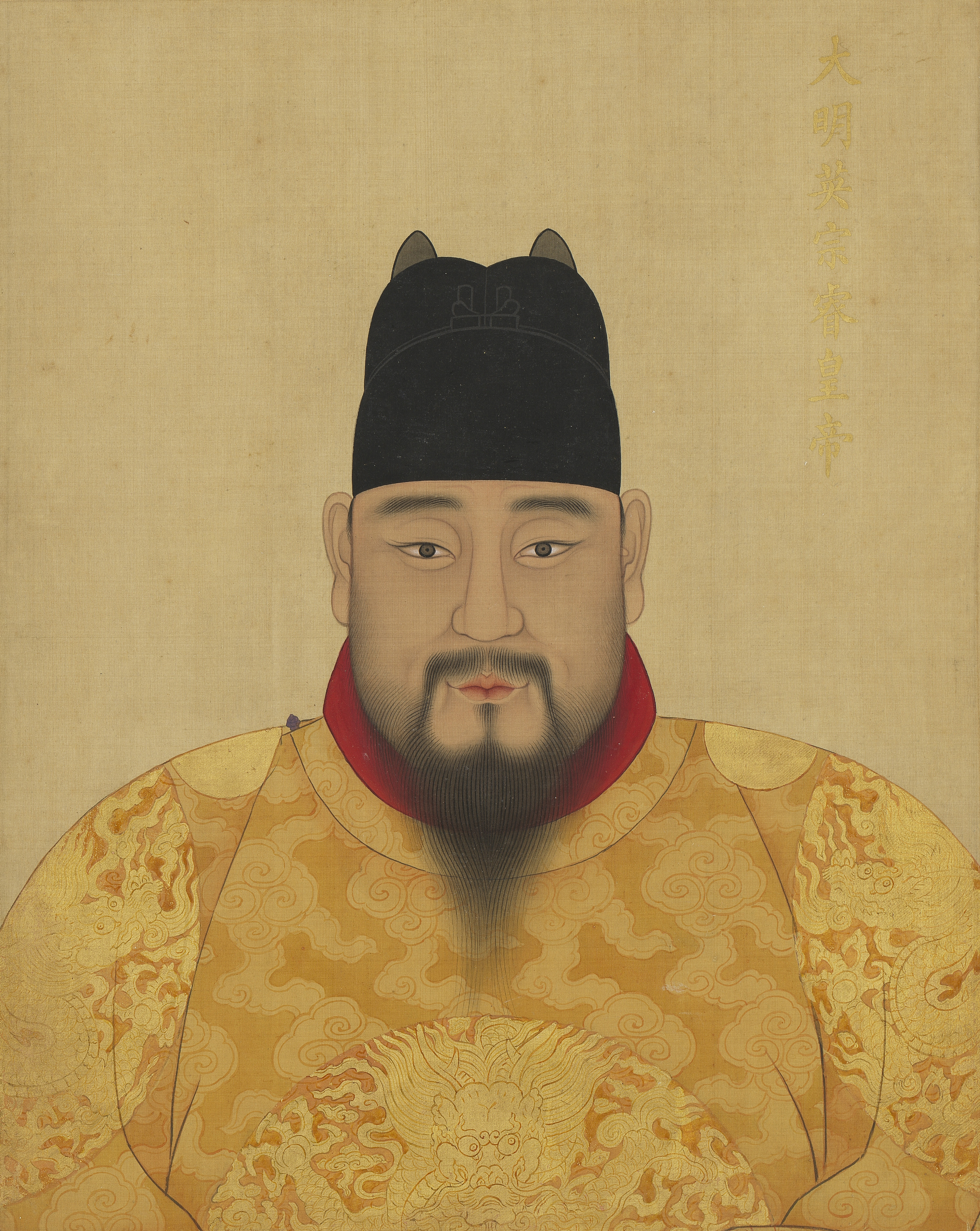
Portrait of Emperor Yingzong

Emperor Yingzong, the 6th emperor of the Ming dynasty of China, had one empress during his two reigns, as well as a large number of consorts of various ranks. His empress was Lady Qian, whom he married on 8 June 1442. In 1449, the Mongols captured Emperor Yingzong during the Battle of Tumu. They released him a year later but his younger brother and successor, the Jingtai Emperor, placed him and his family under house arrest. During that time, Empress Qian stood by her husband, and Emperor Yingzong later expressed his gratitude by declaring, "The empress Qian shall lie with me in the same tomb for a thousand autumns and ten thousand years". Emperor Yingzong regained the throne in 1457 after a palace coup and Lady Qian again became empress.

Empress Qian had no children, and Emperor Yingzong's son and successor, the Chenghua Emperor, was born to a concubine, Lady Zhou. During Emperor Yingzong's reign, Lady Zhou was only a secondary consort, ranking below Empress Qian. When her son took the throne in 1464, she demanded to be given the title of empress dowager like Lady Qian. The Chenghua Emperor asked Senior Grand Secretary Li Xian (李賢) to devise a compromise that would satisfy both parties while adhering to proper ritual protocol. Both women were made empress dowagers, with Lady Qian's formal title reflecting her seniority and higher place in court precedence. Lady Zhou, however, was dissatisfied with the arrangement and kept pressing for further advantages. Empress Dowager Qian died in 1468 and was to be interred in Emperor Yingzong's tomb. Empress Dowager Zhou objected and insisted that the honor should be reserved for herself. She held to this demand for four days, until several hundred officials knelt wailing at the palace gate for eight hours and forced her to yield. Nevertheless, she secretly had Empress Dowager Qian buried in a chamber separate from that of Emperor Yingzong. The circumstances of Lady Qian's burial were discovered when Lady Zhou died in 1504 and the tomb was reopened for the latter's burial beside Emperor Yingzong.

Among Emperor Yingzong's consorts, Lady Wan was his particular favorite, as she bore him six children, more than any other. She was the daughter of an imperial guard commander and entered the palace at the age of two. It is not known when she became the Emperor's concubine, but she was granted the title of Consort Chen (宸妃) in 1457. Ten years later, she died and the Chenghua Emperor suspended court audiences for five days in mourning.

== List ==
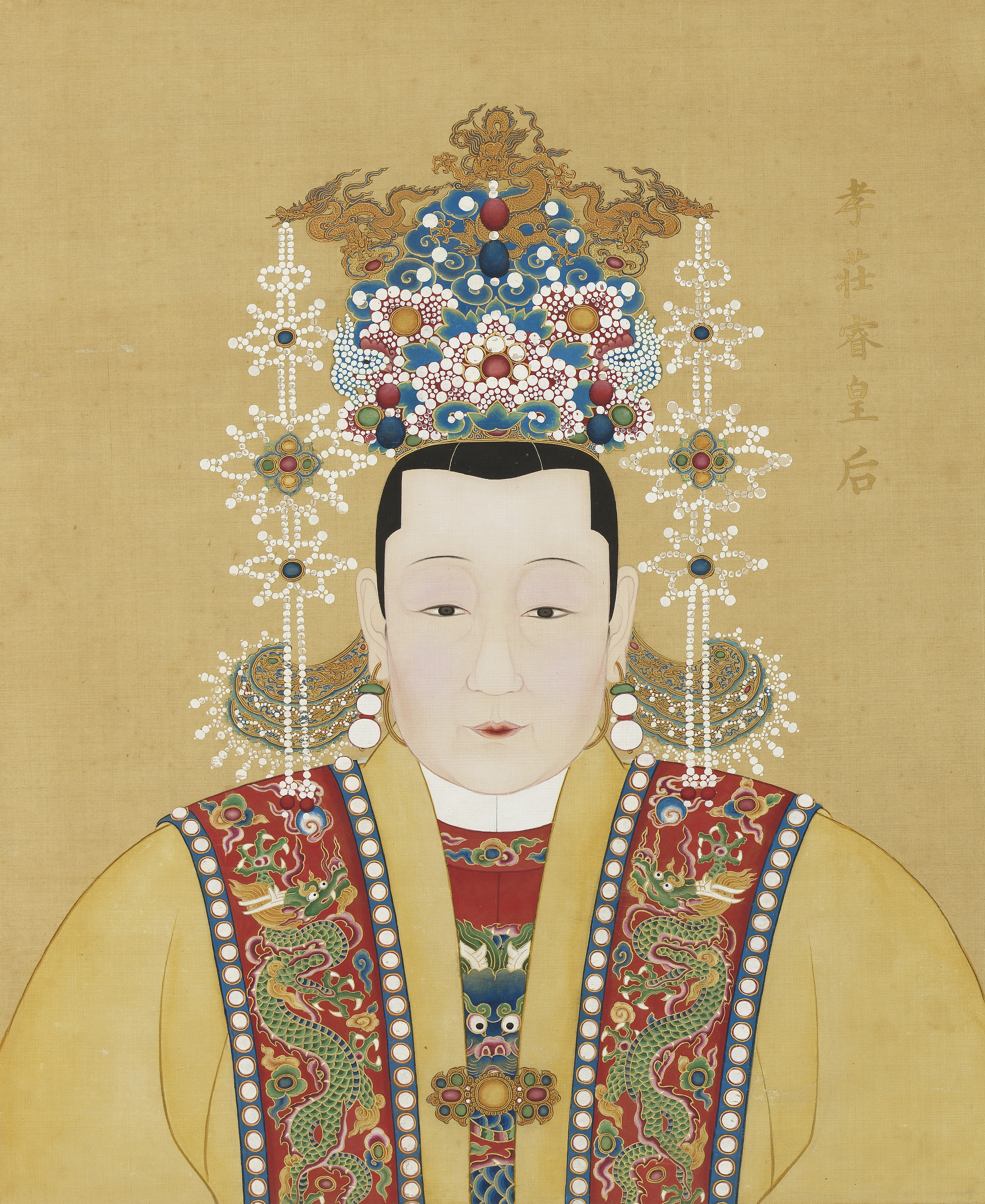
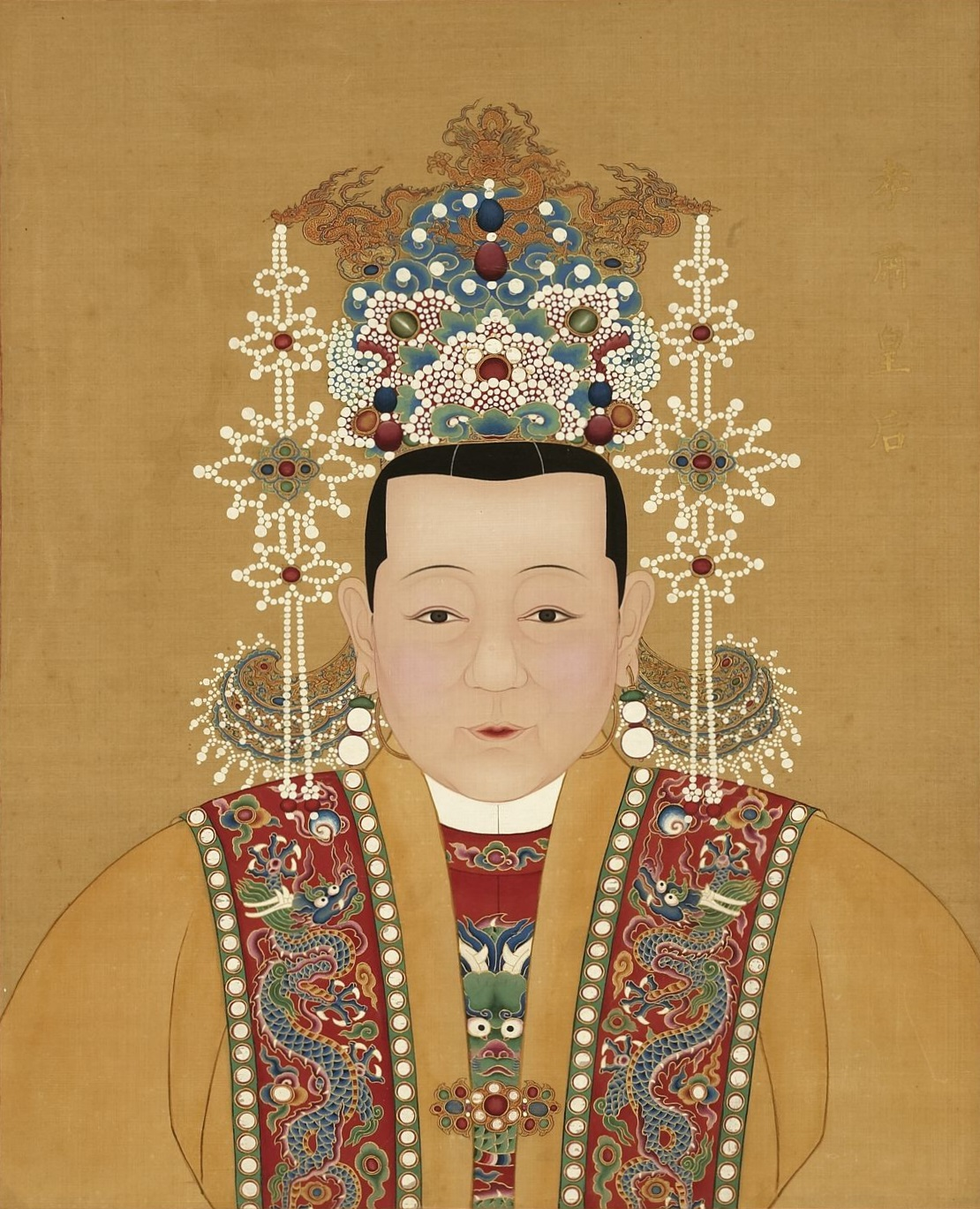
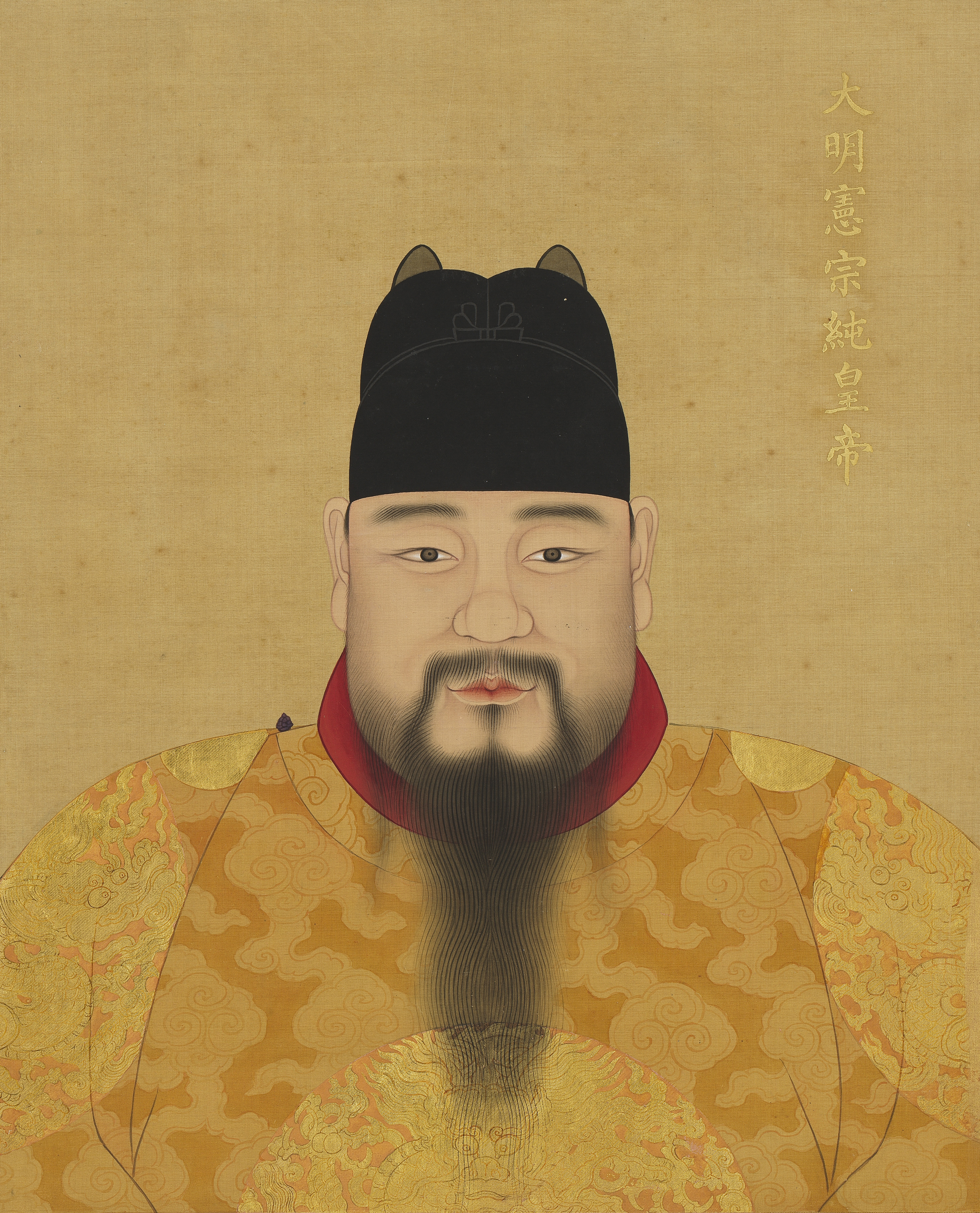
From left to right: Lady Qian, Emperor Yingzong's empress; Lady Zhou, the mother of the Chenghua Emperor; and the Chenghua Emperor, Emperor Yingzong's eldest son and successor

Consorts and children of Emperor Yingzong of Ming
Consorts	Children (Note: Children of Emperor Yingzong of Ming by his respective consorts, with birth order indicated)
Empress Xiaozhuangrui (孝莊睿皇后) of the Qian clan (錢氏; 1426–1468)	—N/a
Empress Xiaosu (孝肅皇后) of the Zhou clan (周氏; 1430–1504)	Princess Chongqing (重慶公主; d. 1499), first daughter. Married in 1461 to Zhou Jing (周景; d. 1495).
Empress Xiaosu (孝肅皇后) of the Zhou clan (周氏; 1430–1504)	Zhu Jianshen (朱見深), the Chenghua Emperor (成化帝; 1447–1487), first son
Empress Xiaosu (孝肅皇后) of the Zhou clan (周氏; 1430–1504)	Zhu Jianze (朱見澤), Prince Jian of Chong (崇簡王; 1455–1505), sixth son
Consort Jingzhuanganmuchen (靖莊安穆宸妃) of the Wan clan (萬氏; 1431–1467)	Zhu Jianlin (朱見潾), Prince Zhuang of De (德莊王; 1448–1517), second son
Consort Jingzhuanganmuchen (靖莊安穆宸妃) of the Wan clan (萬氏; 1431–1467)	Zhu Jianshi (朱見湜; 1449–1451), third son
Consort Jingzhuanganmuchen (靖莊安穆宸妃) of the Wan clan (萬氏; 1431–1467)	Princess Chun'an (淳安公主), third daughter. Married in 1466 to Cai Zhen (蔡震).
Consort Jingzhuanganmuchen (靖莊安穆宸妃) of the Wan clan (萬氏; 1431–1467)	Princess Guangde (廣德公主; d. 1484), personal name Yanxiang (延祥), fifth daughter. Married in 1472 to Fan Kai (樊凱).
Consort Jingzhuanganmuchen (靖莊安穆宸妃) of the Wan clan (萬氏; 1431–1467)	Zhu Jianjun (朱見浚), Prince Jian of Ji (吉簡王; 1456–1527), seventh son
Consort Jingzhuanganmuchen (靖莊安穆宸妃) of the Wan clan (萬氏; 1431–1467)	Zhu Jianzhi (朱見治), Prince Mu of Xin (忻穆王; 1458–1472), eighth son
Consort Duanjinganhehui (端靖安和惠妃) of the Wang clan (王氏; 1429–1485)	Princess Jiashan (嘉善公主; d. 1499), second daughter. Married in 1466 to Wang Zeng (王增), grandson of Minister of War Wang Ji.
Consort Duanjinganhehui (端靖安和惠妃) of the Wang clan (王氏; 1429–1485)	Zhu Jianchun (朱見淳), Prince Dao of Xu (許悼王; 1450–1453), fourth son
Consort Zhuangxiduansu'an (莊僖端肅安妃) of the Yang clan (楊氏; d. 1486)	Princess Chongde (崇德公主; d. 1489), fourth daughter. Married in 1466 to Yang Wei (楊偉), grandson of Yang Shan, Earl of Xingji.
Consort Zhuangjinganrongshu (莊靜安榮淑妃) of the Gao clan (高氏; 1429–1511)	Zhu Jianshu (朱見澍), Prince Huai of Xiu (秀懷王; 1452–1472), fifth son
Consort Zhuangjinganrongshu (莊靜安榮淑妃) of the Gao clan (高氏; 1429–1511)	Princess Longqing (隆慶公主; d. 1480), seventh daughter. Married in 1473 to You Tai (遊泰).
Consort Gongduanzhuanghuide (恭端莊惠德妃) of the Wei clan (魏氏; 1426–1469)	Princess Yixing (宜興公主; d. 1514), sixth daughter. Married in 1473 to Ma Cheng (馬誠).
Consort Gongduanzhuanghuide (恭端莊惠德妃) of the Wei clan (魏氏; 1426–1469)	Ninth daughter
Consort Gongduanzhuanghuide (恭端莊惠德妃) of the Wei clan (魏氏; 1426–1469)	Zhu Jianpei (朱見沛), Prince Zhuang of Hui (徽莊王; 1462–1505), ninth son
Consort Gongheanjingshun (恭和安靜順妃) of the Fan clan (樊氏; 1414–1470)	Tenth daughter
Consort Anherongjingli (安和榮靖麗妃) of the Liu clan (劉氏; 1426–1512)	Princess Jiaxiang (嘉祥公主; d. 1483), eighth daughter. Married in 1477 to Huang Yong (黃鏞).
Consort Zhaosujingduanxian (昭肅靖端賢妃) of the Wang clan (王氏; 1430–1474)	—N/a
Consort Duanzhuangzhao (端莊昭妃) of the Wu clan (武氏; 1431–1467)	—N/a
Consort Gong'anhe (恭安和妃) of the Gong clan (宮氏; 1430–1467)	—N/a
Consort Rongjingzhen (榮靖貞妃) of the Wang clan (王氏; 1427–1507)	—N/a
Consort Gongjingzhuang (恭靖莊妃) of the Zhao clan (趙氏; 1446–1514)	—N/a
Consort Zhenshunyigongjing (貞順懿恭敬妃) of the Liu clan (劉氏; d. 1463)	—N/a
Consort Zhaojinggong (昭靜恭妃) of the Liu clan (劉氏; d. 1500)	—N/a
Consort Zhaoyixian (昭懿賢妃) of the Li clan (李氏)	—N/a
Consort Duanheyi (端和懿妃) of the Huang clan (黃氏; d. 1491)	—N/a
Consort Gongxicheng (恭僖成妃) of the Zhang clan (張氏; d. 1504)	—N/a
Consort Xikechong (僖恪充妃) of the Yu clan (余氏; d. 1503)	—N/a
Consort Huiheli (惠和麗妃) of the Chen clan (陳氏; d. 1500)	—N/a
