= Consort Cheng =

Consort Cheng may refer to:

- Empress Dowager Cheng (died 335), concubine of Later Zhao's founding emperor Shi Le
- Concubine Cheng (Qianlong) (died 1784), concubine of the Qianlong Emperor
- Noble Consort Cheng (1813–1888), concubine of the Daoguang Emperor

== See also ==
- Consort Zheng (disambiguation)
- Consort Chen (disambiguation)
