= 416 (disambiguation) =

For the year, see 416 or 416 BC. 416 is the number between 415 and 417.

416 may also refer to:

- April 16
- 416 (number)
- 416, the area code for Toronto, Canada
- Heckler & Koch HK416
- .416 Barrett
- .416 Rigby
- 416, a visual novel
- UR-416, a West German armoured car
- Ontario Highway 416

== See also ==
- 416th (disambiguation)
