= 334 =

334 in various calendars
- Gregorian calendar: 334; CCCXXXIV
- Ab urbe condita: 1087
- Assyrian calendar: 5084
- Balinese saka calendar: 255–256
- Bengali calendar: −260 – −259
- Berber calendar: 1284
- Buddhist calendar: 878
- Burmese calendar: −304
- Byzantine calendar: 5842–5843
- Chinese calendar: 癸巳年 (Water Snake); 3031 or 2824 — to — 甲午年 (Wood Horse); 3032 or 2825
- Coptic calendar: 50–51
- Discordian calendar: 1500
- Ethiopian calendar: 326–327
- Hebrew calendar: 4094–4095
- Hindu calendars
- Vikram Samvat: 390–391
- Shaka Samvat: 255–256
- Kali Yuga: 3434–3435
- Holocene calendar: 10334
- Iranian calendar: 288 BP – 287 BP
- Islamic calendar: 297 BH – 296 BH
- Javanese calendar: 215–216
- Julian calendar: 334; CCCXXXIV
- Korean calendar: 2667
- Minguo calendar: 1578 before ROC 民前1578年
- Nanakshahi calendar: −1134
- Seleucid era: 645/646 AG
- Thai solar calendar: 876–877
- Tibetan calendar: ཆུ་མོ་སྦྲུལ་ལོ་ (female Water-Snake); 460 or 79 or −693 — to — ཤིང་ཕོ་རྟ་ལོ་ (male Wood-Horse); 461 or 80 or −692

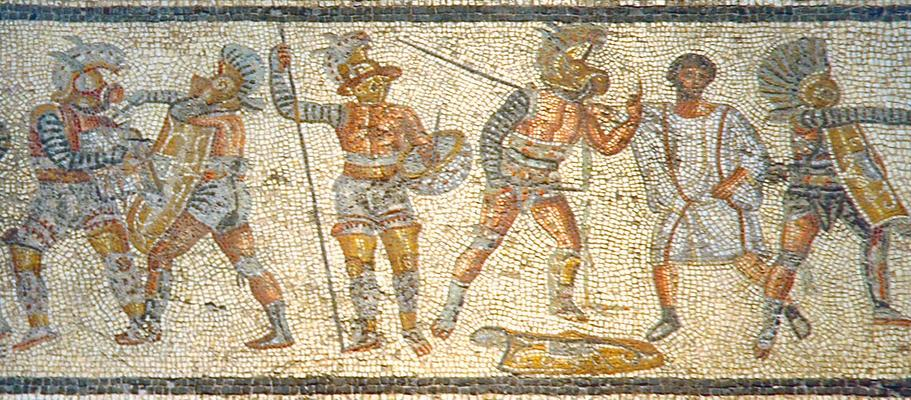
Gladiators from the Zliten mosaic (Libya)

Year 334 (CCCXXXIV) was a common year starting on Tuesday of the Julian calendar. At the time, it was known as the Year of the Consulship of Optatus and Caesonius (or, less frequently, year 1087 Ab urbe condita). The denomination 334 for this year has been used since the early medieval period, when the Anno Domini calendar era became the prevalent method in Europe for naming years.

== Events ==
=== By place ===
==== Roman Empire ====
- Flavius Dalmatius puts down a revolt in Cyprus, led by Calocaerus. Calocaerus is brought to Tarsus (Cilicia), and executed.
- The Goths protect the Danube frontier against an invasion by the Vandals.
- Emperor Constantine the Great reauthorises gladiatorial combat.

== Births ==
- Huiyuan, Chinese Buddhist teacher and founder of Donglin Temple (d. 416)
- Sabbas the Goth, Christian reader and saint (d. 372)
- Virius Nicomachus Flavianus, Roman historian and politician (d. 394)

== Deaths ==
- December 5 – Li Ban, Chinese emperor of Cheng-Han (b. 288)
- Calocaerus, Roman usurper
- Li Xiong, Chinese emperor of Cheng-Han (b. 274)
- Shi Hong, Chinese emperor of the Jie state (b. 313)
- Tao Kan (or Shixing), Chinese general and politician (b. 259)
- Wei Huacun (or Xianan), Chinese religious leader (b. 252)
- Yang Nandi, Chinese general and ruler of Chouchi
