= 288 (disambiguation) =

288 may refer to:

- The year 288 AD
- The year 288 BC
- The number 288
- The Ferrari 288 GTO, an automobile
- The USS Cabrilla (SS-288), a USN submarine
- The USS Worden (DD-288), a USN destroyer
- The Bagger 288 excavator
- 288 Glauke, an asteroid discovered in 1890
- List of highways numbered 288
