= 416th Division =

416th Division may refer to:

- 416th Infantry Division, Wehrmacht, Germany
- 416th Rifle Division, Soviet Union

== See also ==
- List of military divisions by number
- 416th (disambiguation)
