= 416th =

416th may refer to:

- 416th Air Expeditionary Operations Group, provisional unit assigned to the United States Air Force Air Mobility Command
- 416th Bombardment Wing, inactive United States Air Force unit
- 416th Engineer Command (TEC), US Army Reserve unit that conducts theater-level engineer operations for US Army Central Command
- 416th Fighter Squadron, inactive United States Air Force unit
- 416th Flight Test Squadron (416 FLTS*), part of the 412th Test Wing, based at Edwards Air Force Base, California

== See also ==
- 416 (number)
- 416 (disambiguation)
- 416, the year 416 (CDXVI) of the Julian calendar
- 416 BC
