= 335 =

335 in various calendars
- Gregorian calendar: 335; CCCXXXV
- Ab urbe condita: 1088
- Assyrian calendar: 5085
- Balinese saka calendar: 256–257
- Bengali calendar: −259 – −258
- Berber calendar: 1285
- Buddhist calendar: 879
- Burmese calendar: −303
- Byzantine calendar: 5843–5844
- Chinese calendar: 甲午年 (Wood Horse); 3032 or 2825 — to — 乙未年 (Wood Goat); 3033 or 2826
- Coptic calendar: 51–52
- Discordian calendar: 1501
- Ethiopian calendar: 327–328
- Hebrew calendar: 4095–4096
- Hindu calendars
- Vikram Samvat: 391–392
- Shaka Samvat: 256–257
- Kali Yuga: 3435–3436
- Holocene calendar: 10335
- Iranian calendar: 287 BP – 286 BP
- Islamic calendar: 296 BH – 295 BH
- Javanese calendar: 216–217
- Julian calendar: 335; CCCXXXV
- Korean calendar: 2668
- Minguo calendar: 1577 before ROC 民前1577年
- Nanakshahi calendar: −1133
- Seleucid era: 646/647 AG
- Thai solar calendar: 877–878
- Tibetan calendar: ཤིང་ཕོ་རྟ་ལོ་ (male Wood-Horse); 461 or 80 or −692 — to — ཤིང་མོ་ལུག་ལོ་ (female Wood-Sheep); 462 or 81 or −691

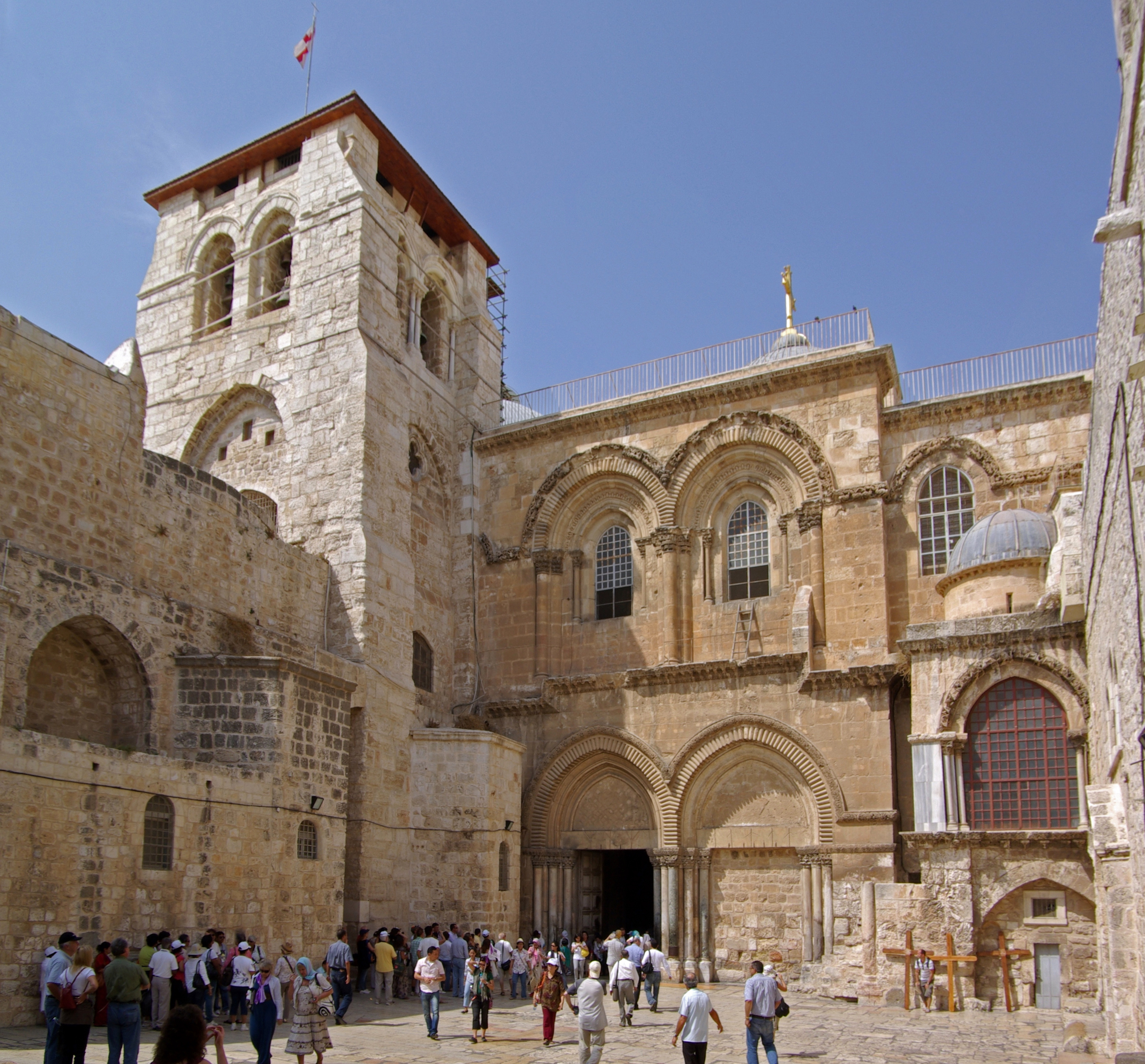
Church of the Holy Sepulchre

Year 335 (CCCXXXV) was a common year starting on Wednesday of the Julian calendar. At the time, it was known as the Year of the Consulship of Constantius and Albinus (or, less frequently, year 1088 Ab urbe condita). The denomination 335 for this year has been used since the early medieval period, when the Anno Domini calendar era became the prevalent method in Europe for naming years.

== Events ==
=== By place ===
==== Roman Empire ====
- September 14 – Emperor Constantine I consecrates the Church of the Holy Sepulchre in Jerusalem.
- September 19 – Flavius Dalmatius is raised to the rank of Caesar, with control of Thracia, Achaia, and Macedonia.
- Hannibalianus, nephew of Constantine I, is made Rex Regum ("King of Kings of the Pontic people").
- November 7 – Athanasius is banished to Trier, on the charge that he prevented the grain fleet from sailing to Constantinople.

==== Asia ====
- Samudragupta succeeds Chandragupta I as king of the Gupta Empire.
- Tuoba Hena ousts Tuoba Yihuai as chieftain of the Tuoba Clan.
- Emperor Shi Hu moves the capital of the Later Zhao state to Yecheng.

=== By topic ===
==== Religion ====
- First Synod of Tyre: Constantine I convenes a gathering of bishops at Tyre to depose and exile Patriarch Athanasius of Alexandria.
- Constantine I reinstates the Alexandrian priest Arius (declared a heretic at the First Council of Nicaea in 325) in a synod at Jerusalem about a year before Arius' death.
- September 13 – The Church of the Holy Sepulchre in Jerusalem is consecrated.
- December 31 – Pope Sylvester I dies at Rome after a 21-year reign. He is succeeded by Mark as the 34th pope.

== Births ==
- Fu Sheng, Chinese emperor of the Di state Former Qin (d. 357)
- Gregory of Nyssa, Christian bishop and saint (approximate date)
- Magnus Maximus, Western Roman emperor (approximate date)
- Theon of Alexandria, director of the Library of Alexandria (approximate date)

== Deaths ==
- December 31 – Sylvester I, pope of the Catholic Church (b. 285)
- Chandragupta I, Indian king of the Gupta Empire
- Cheng, Chinese empress dowager of the Later Zhao state
- Lady Xun (or Yuzhang), Chinese concubine of Yuan of Jin
