= Consort Chen =

Consort Chen may refer to:

== Imperial consorts with the surname Chen ==
- Chen Jiao (166 BC?–110 BC?), wife of Emperor Wu of Han
- Lady Chen (fl.130 - 175), mother of Emperor Zhi of Han
- Chen Guinü (died 390), concubine of Emperor Xiaowu of Jin
- Chen Miaodeng (fl. 440s), concubine of Liu Yu (Emperor Ming of Liu Song)
- Consort Chen Farong (fl. 460s–470s), concubine of Liu Yu (Emperor Ming of Liu Song)
- Chen Yueyi (565?–650?), wife of Yuwen Yun (Emperor Xuan of Northern Zhou)
- Consort Chen (Sui dynasty) (577–605), concubine of Emperor Wen of Sui
- Chen Jinfeng (893–935), wife of Wang Yanjun (Emperor Huizong of Min)
- Empress Chen (Jiajing) (1508–1528), wife of the Jiajing Emperor
- Empress Chen (Longqing) (died 1596), wife of the Longqing Emperor
- Consort Fang (died 1801), concubine of the Qianlong Emperor
- Dowager Noble Consort Wan (1717–1807), concubine of the Qianlong Emperor

== Imperial consorts with the title Consort Chen ==
- Consort Li (Zhenzong) (987–1032), concubine of Emperor Zhenzong of Song, known as Consort Chen in 1032
- Consort Chen (Yingzong) (1431–1467), concubine of Emperor Yingzong of Ming, known as Consort Chen after 1457
- Harjol (1609–1641), concubine of Hong Taiji, known as Consort Chen after 1636

== See also ==
- Consort Zhen (disambiguation)
- Consort Cheng (disambiguation)
