= AD 171 =

171 in various calendars
- Gregorian calendar: 171; CLXXI
- Ab urbe condita: 924
- Assyrian calendar: 4921
- Balinese saka calendar: 92–93
- Bengali calendar: −423 – −422
- Berber calendar: 1121
- Buddhist calendar: 715
- Burmese calendar: −467
- Byzantine calendar: 5679–5680
- Chinese calendar: 庚戌年 (Metal Dog); 2868 or 2661 — to — 辛亥年 (Metal Pig); 2869 or 2662
- Coptic calendar: −113 – −112
- Discordian calendar: 1337
- Ethiopian calendar: 163–164
- Hebrew calendar: 3931–3932
- Hindu calendars
- Vikram Samvat: 227–228
- Shaka Samvat: 92–93
- Kali Yuga: 3271–3272
- Holocene calendar: 10171
- Iranian calendar: 451 BP – 450 BP
- Islamic calendar: 465 BH – 464 BH
- Javanese calendar: 47–48
- Julian calendar: 171; CLXXI
- Korean calendar: 2504
- Minguo calendar: 1741 before ROC 民前1741年
- Nanakshahi calendar: −1297
- Seleucid era: 482/483 AG
- Thai solar calendar: 713–714
- Tibetan calendar: ལྕགས་ཕོ་ཁྱི་ལོ་ (male Iron-Dog); 297 or −84 or −856 — to — ལྕགས་མོ་ཕག་ལོ་ (female Iron-Boar); 298 or −83 or −855

Year 171 (CLXXI) was a common year starting on Monday of the Julian calendar. At the time, it was known in Rome as the Year of the Consulship of Severus and Herennianus (or, less frequently, year 924 Ab urbe condita). The denomination 171 for this year has been used since the early medieval period, when the Anno Domini calendar era became the prevalent method in Europe for naming years.

== Events ==
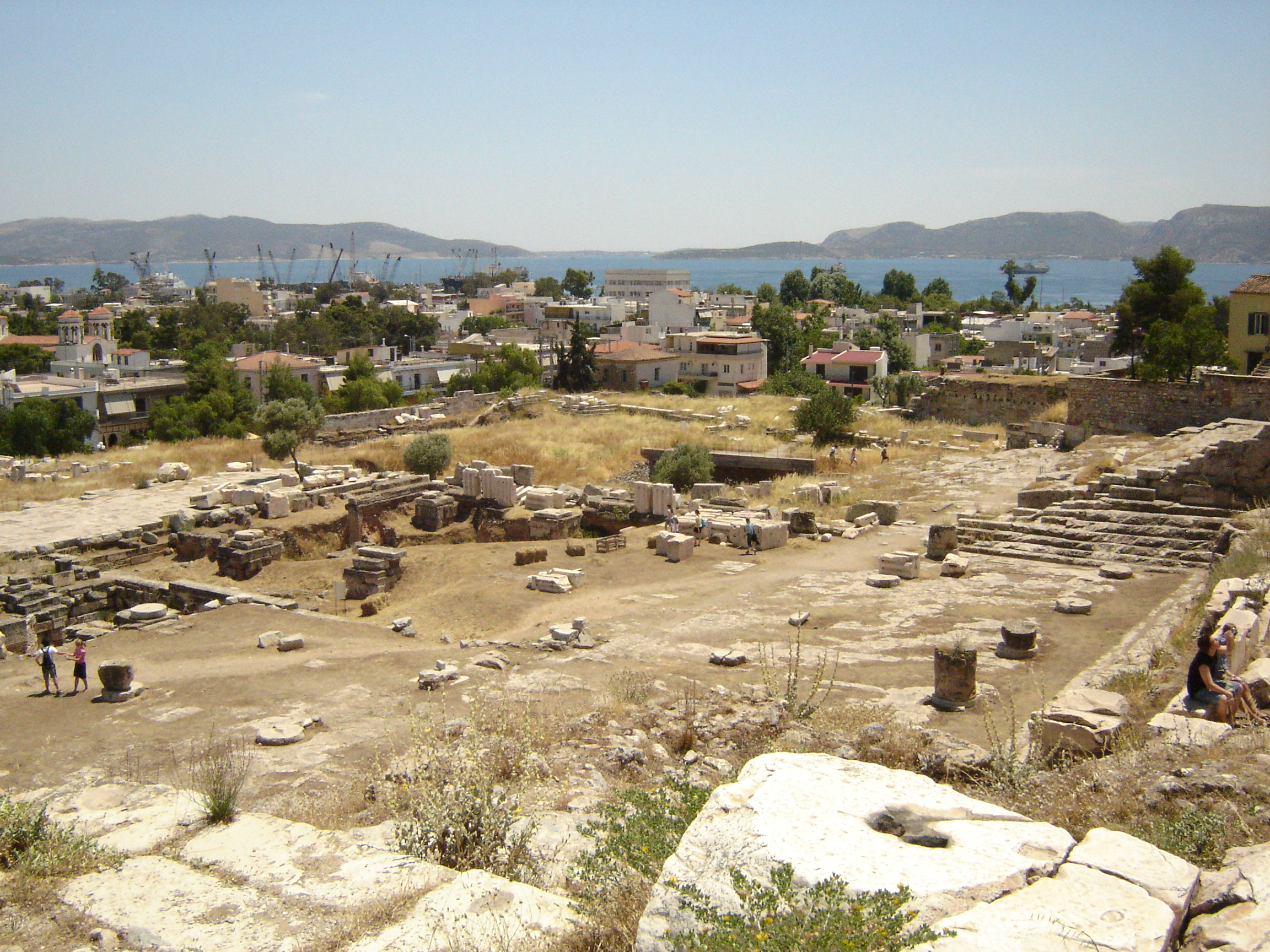
Ruins at Eleusis (Greece). View over the excavation site towards the Saronic Gulf.

=== By place ===
==== Roman Empire ====
- Emperor Marcus Aurelius forms a new military command, the praetentura Italiae et Alpium. Aquileia is relieved, and the Marcomanni are evicted from Roman territory.
- Marcus Aurelius signs a peace treaty with the Quadi and the Sarmatian Iazyges. The Germanic tribes of the Hasdingi (Vandals) and the Lacringi become Roman allies.
- Armenia and Mesopotamia become protectorates of the Roman Empire.
- The Costoboci cross the Danube (Dacia) and ravage Thrace in the Balkan Peninsula. They reach Eleusis, near Athens, and destroy the temple of the Eleusinian Mysteries.
- May – June – Aelius Aristides, Greek orator, delivers a public speech in Smyrna, lamenting the damage recently inflicted to the sacred site of Eleusis.

== Births ==
- Sima Lang, Chinese official and politician (d. 217)
- Tian Yu, Chinese general and politician (d. 252)
- Xu Gan, Chinese philosopher and poet (d. 218)
- Zhao Yan, Chinese general and politician (d. 245)
