= 299 =

299 in various calendars
Gregorian calendar	299; CCXCIX
Ab urbe condita	1052
Assyrian calendar	5049
Balinese saka calendar	220–221
Bengali calendar	−295 – −294
Berber calendar	1249
Buddhist calendar	843
Burmese calendar	−339
Byzantine calendar	5807–5808
Chinese calendar	戊午年 (Earth Horse); 2996 or 2789 — to — 己未年 (Earth Goat); 2997 or 2790
Coptic calendar	15–16
Discordian calendar	1465
Ethiopian calendar	291–292
Hebrew calendar	4059–4060
- Hindu calendars
Vikram Samvat	355–356
Shaka Samvat	220–221
Kali Yuga	3399–3400
Holocene calendar	10299
Iranian calendar	323 BP – 322 BP
Islamic calendar	333 BH – 332 BH
Javanese calendar	179–180
Julian calendar	299; CCXCIX
Korean calendar	2632
Minguo calendar	1613 before ROC 民前1613年
Nanakshahi calendar	−1169
Seleucid era	610/611 AG
Thai solar calendar	841–842
Tibetan calendar	阳土马年 (male Earth-Horse); 425 or 44 or −728 — to — 阴土羊年 (female Earth-Goat); 426 or 45 or −727

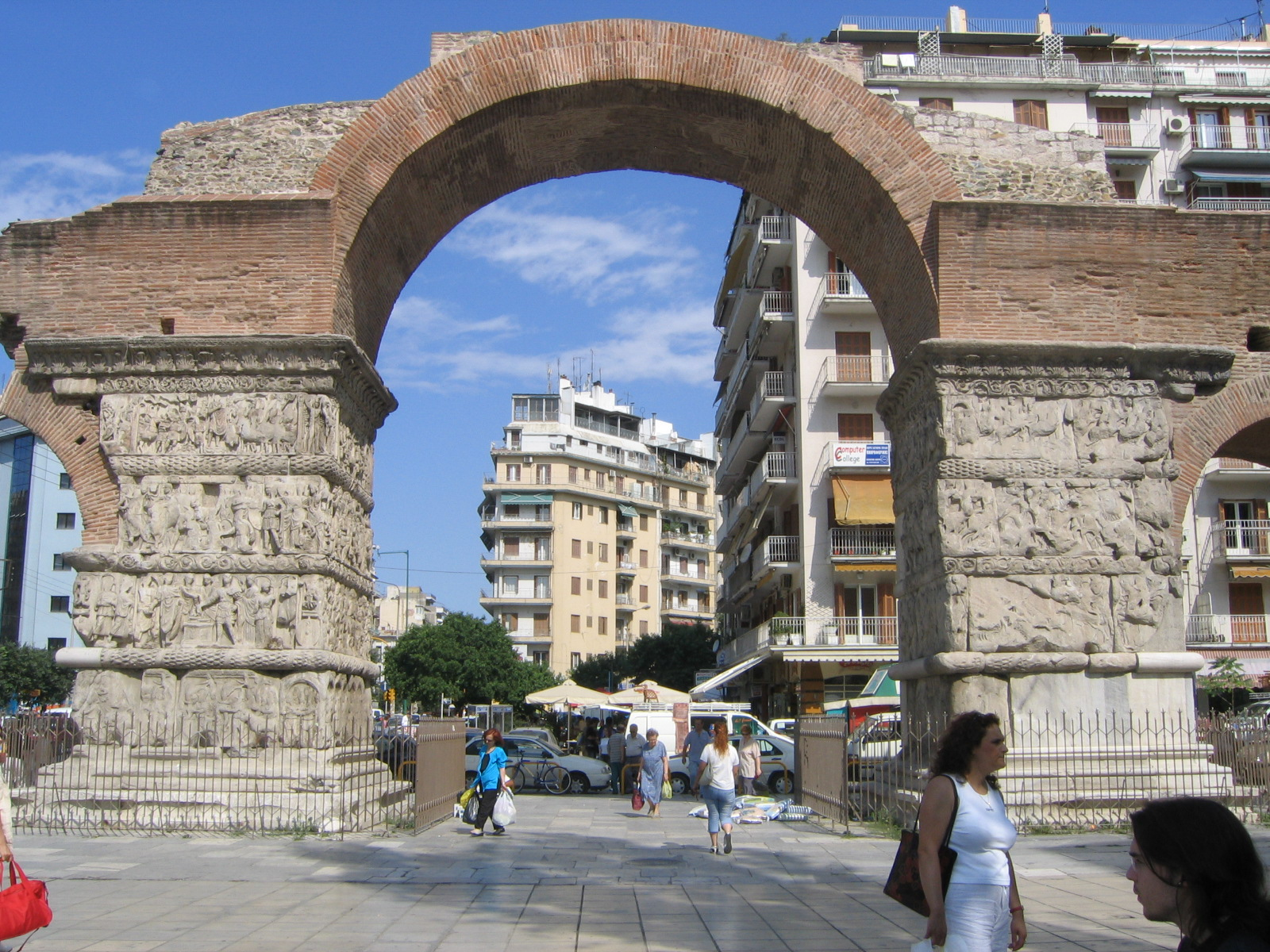
Arch of Galerius (Thessaloniki)

Year 299 (CCXCIX) was a common year starting on Sunday of the Julian calendar. In the Roman Empire, it was known as the Year of the Consulship of Diocletian and Maximian (or, less frequently, year 1052 Ab urbe condita). The denomination 299 for this year has been used since the early medieval period, when the Anno Domini calendar era became the prevalent method in Europe for naming years.

== Events ==
=== By place ===
==== Roman Empire ====
- Peace of Nisibis: Emperor Diocletian signs a treaty with the Persian king Narseh that will last for 40 years. The Persians accept Roman dominion over Armenia, the Caucasus, and Upper Mesopotamia. The pro-Roman ruler Tiridates III receives all of Armenia as far as the border with Atropatene. Mirian III of the Kingdom of Iberia is made a Roman client, and at some point in time, as a result of the treaty, Caucasian Albania will follow suit. Rome also gains five satrapies beyond the Tigris, which are perhaps given to Tiridates to administer.
- To celebrate his victory over the Persians, Galerius commissions the Arch of Galerius in Thessaloniki (modern Greece).
- In this or the following year, Galerius campaigns with success against Sarmatians and the Marcomanni, attacking through a swamp to defeat a Sarmatian army.
- Having first crossed into Africa in 296, Emperor Maximian concludes his campaigns against the Quinquegentiani and other Berbers. His campaigns had ranged as far as Mauretania in the west and Tripolitania in the east. Julianus, a rebel leader in Africa, throws himself into a fire after the Romans breach the walls of his stronghold.
- Returning to Rome in triumph, Maximian commissions the Baths of Diocletian in honour of his 'brother' Diocletian.
- Diocletian expels Christians from the Roman army.

==== China ====
- Empress Jia Nanfeng frames Crown Prince Yu for treason and has him deposed.

== Births ==
- Jin Mingdi, Chinese emperor of the Jin Dynasty (d. 325)

== Deaths ==
- Judah bar Ezekiel, Babylonian amora (b. 220)
- Qi Wannian, Chinese chieftain and rebel leader
