= Chen Fei (politician) =

Chinese politician

- Born: January 1975 (age 50); Jinan, China
- Occupation: Chinese politician

Chen Fei (Chinese: 陈飞; born January 1975) is a Chinese politician, serving since 2015 as the mayor of Dezhou, Shandong province.

Chen was born in Jinan. He has a doctorate in law. He rose through the ranks in the Communist Youth League organization of Qingdao. In February 2012 he was made head of the Qingdao Hi-tech Zone. In 2015 he was elevated to mayor of Dezhou, becoming one of the youngest prefecture-level mayors in China.
