= 274 =

274 in various calendars
Gregorian calendar	274; CCLXXIV
Ab urbe condita	1027
Assyrian calendar	5024
Balinese saka calendar	195–196
Bengali calendar	−320 – −319
Berber calendar	1224
Buddhist calendar	818
Burmese calendar	−364
Byzantine calendar	5782–5783
Chinese calendar	癸巳年 (Water Snake); 2971 or 2764 — to — 甲午年 (Wood Horse); 2972 or 2765
Coptic calendar	−10 – −9
Discordian calendar	1440
Ethiopian calendar	266–267
Hebrew calendar	4034–4035
- Hindu calendars
Vikram Samvat	330–331
Shaka Samvat	195–196
Kali Yuga	3374–3375
Holocene calendar	10274
Iranian calendar	348 BP – 347 BP
Islamic calendar	359 BH – 358 BH
Javanese calendar	153–154
Julian calendar	274; CCLXXIV
Korean calendar	2607
Minguo calendar	1638 before ROC 民前1638年
Nanakshahi calendar	−1194
Seleucid era	585/586 AG
Thai solar calendar	816–817
Tibetan calendar	阴水蛇年 (female Water-Snake); 400 or 19 or −753 — to — 阳木马年 (male Wood-Horse); 401 or 20 or −752

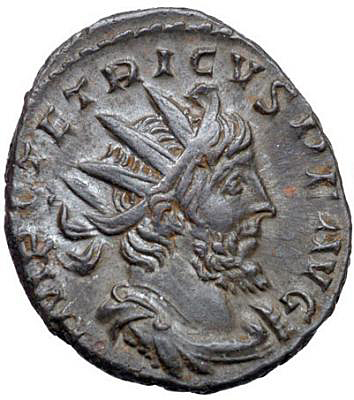
Coin of Tetricus I

Year 274 (CCLXXIV) was a common year starting on Thursday of the Julian calendar. At the time, it was known as the Year of the Consulship of Aurelianus and Capitolinus (or, less frequently, year 1027 Ab urbe condita). The denomination 274 for this year has been used since the early medieval period, when the Anno Domini calendar era became the prevalent method in Europe for naming years.

== Events ==
=== By place ===
==== Roman Empire ====
- Battle of Châlons: The Emperor Aurelian invades Gaul to campaign against the Gallic Empire (Gaul and Britain). In the Catalaunian Plains, the Romano-Gallic Emperor Tetricus I surrenders to Aurelian and leaves his army without an emperor. The Gallic army is then crushed by Aurelian in a major battle. With the conquests of the Palmyrene Empire and the Gallic Empire, the Roman Empire is united again. However, the heavy losses incurred by the Gallic forces compromises the Rhine frontier.
- Rome greets Aurelian as Restitutor Orbis ("Restorer of the World") and accords him a magnificent triumph (victory procession), which is graced by his captives Zenobia, Tetricus I, and his son Tetricus II.
- Aurelian reforms the Roman currency, replacing the denarius with a new version of the antoninianus that has a slightly improved silver-to-copper ratio. This overhaul of the currency system causes hyper-inflation.
- Germanic tribes take advantage of the destroyed Roman forces of the Rhine to raid Gaul.
- December 25 – Aurelian has the Temple of the Sun dedicated to Sol Invictus, on the third day after the solstice and day of rebirth of the sun. This religion, which is in essence monotheistic, becomes the state religion of Rome.

==== Africa ====
- The Kingdom of Aksum attains great prosperity thanks to its control of Red Sea trade.

=== By topic ===
==== Religion ====
- March 2 – Mani, a sage of Persia, dies at Gundeshapur after 30 years of preaching his "heresy" at the court of the late Sassanian King Shapur I and on long journeys to Khorasan, India and China. He is executed or allowed to die in prison, and claims to be a prophet of God. Mani combines Zoroastrian dualism with Christian theology, and his disciples gain wide support for Manichaeism, despite opposition from Roman Emperors.
- December 30 – Pope Felix I dies in Rome after a 5-year reign.

==== Transportation ====
- Japanese shipwrights build a 100-foot oar-powered vessel for Emperor Ōjin. The Japanese will not use sails for another seven centuries.

== Births ==
- Li Xiong, Chinese emperor of Cheng Han (d. 334)
- Shi Le, Chinese emperor of the Jie state (d. 333)

== Deaths ==
- March 2 – Mani, prophet and founder of Manichaeism (b. 216)
- June 19 – Xun Yi (or Jingqian), Chinese official and politician
- August 25 – Yang Yan (or Qiongzhi), Chinese empress (b. 238)
- August/September – Lu Kang (or Youjie), Chinese general and politician (b. 226)
- September – Bahram I, king of the Sassanid Empire
- December 30 – Felix I, bishop of Rome
- Cao Fang, deposed Chinese emperor of the Cao Wei state (b. 232)
- After 274 – Septimia Zenobia, queen of the Palmyrene Empire (b. 240)
