= 325 =

325 in various calendars
Gregorian calendar	325; CCCXXV
Ab urbe condita	1078
Assyrian calendar	5075
Balinese saka calendar	246–247
Bengali calendar	−269 – −268
Berber calendar	1275
Buddhist calendar	869
Burmese calendar	−313
Byzantine calendar	5833–5834
Chinese calendar	甲申年 (Wood Monkey); 3022 or 2815 — to — 乙酉年 (Wood Rooster); 3023 or 2816
Coptic calendar	41–42
Discordian calendar	1491
Ethiopian calendar	317–318
Hebrew calendar	4085–4086
- Hindu calendars
Vikram Samvat	381–382
Shaka Samvat	246–247
Kali Yuga	3425–3426
Holocene calendar	10325
Iranian calendar	297 BP – 296 BP
Islamic calendar	306 BH – 305 BH
Javanese calendar	206–207
Julian calendar	325; CCCXXV
Korean calendar	2658
Minguo calendar	1587 before ROC 民前1587年
Nanakshahi calendar	−1143
Seleucid era	636/637 AG
Thai solar calendar	867–868
Tibetan calendar	阳木猴年 (male Wood-Monkey); 451 or 70 or −702 — to — 阴木鸡年 (female Wood-Rooster); 452 or 71 or −701

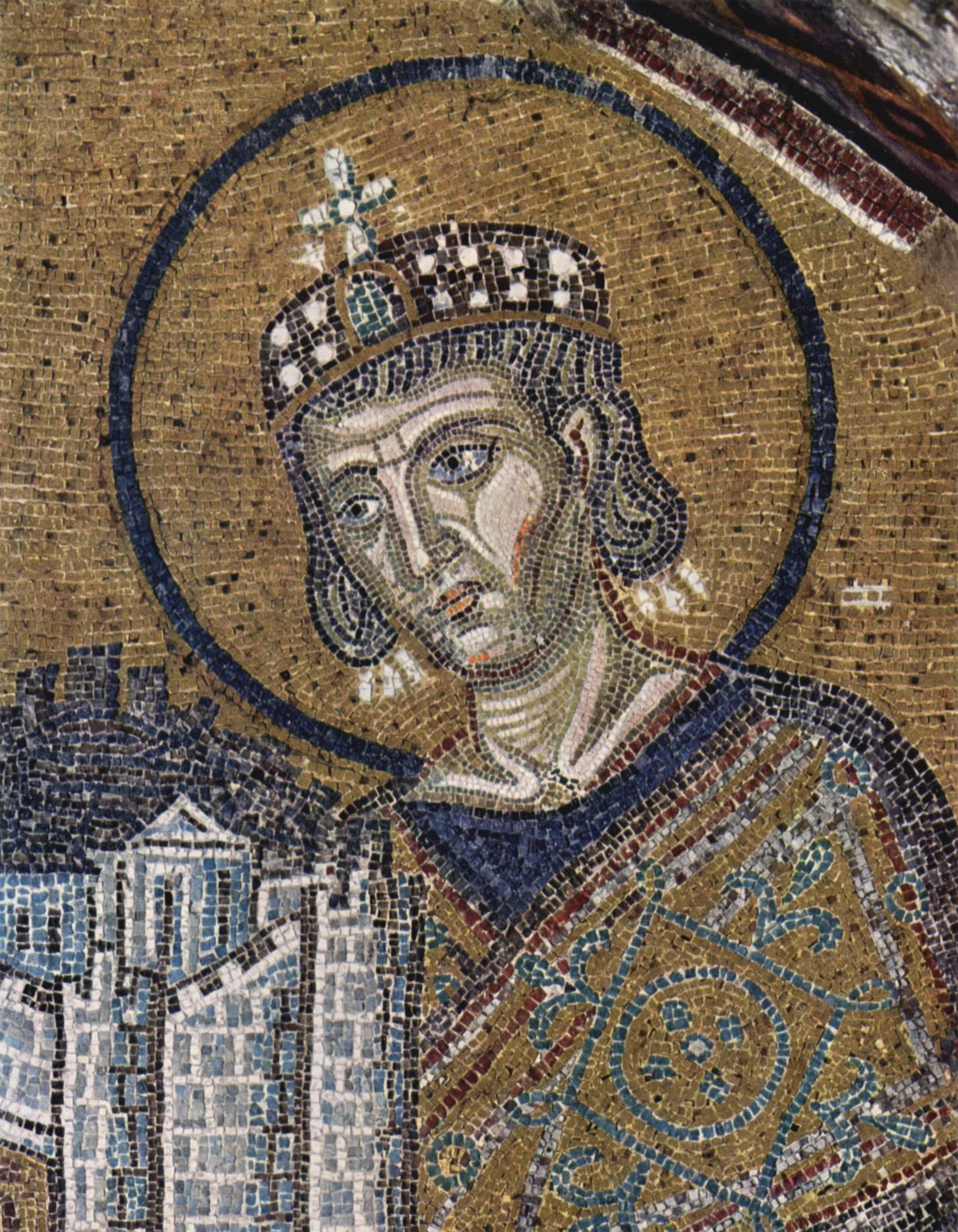
Constantine the Great summons the Christian Church to Nicaea (mosaic in Hagia Sophia, Istanbul)

Year 325 (CCCXXV) was a common year starting on Friday of the Julian calendar. At the time, it was known as the Year of the Consulship of Proculus and Paulinus (or, less frequently, year 1078 Ab urbe condita). The denomination 325 for this year has been used since the early medieval period, when the Anno Domini calendar era became the prevalent method in Europe for naming years.

== Events ==
=== By place ===
==== Roman Empire ====
- German and Sarmatian campaigns of Constantine: Emperor Constantine I personally assures the security of the Danube frontier by defeating the Goths, the Vandals and the Sarmatians.
- Constantine has deposed Emperors Licinius and Martinian executed in Thessalonica and Cappadocia respectively for conspiring and raising troops against him.
- Constantine forbids criminals being forced to fight to the death as gladiators.

==== China ====
- April 1 – Crown Prince Cheng of Jin, age 4, succeeds his father Ming of Jin as emperor of the Eastern Jin dynasty. During his reign, he is largely advised by regents, his uncle Yu Liang and high-level officials.

=== By topic ===
==== Art ====
- The Colossus of Constantine in the Basilica of Maxentius and Constantine, Rome, is perhaps remodelled at about this date. (The remains are moved to the Palazzo dei Conservatori, Rome, in the 15th century).

==== Religion ====
- May 20 – First Council of Nicaea: Constantine summons an ecumenical council of bishops in Nicaea (Turkey). The Nicene Creed, adopted on June 19, declares that the members of the Trinity (the Father, the Son, and the Holy Spirit) are equal. The council decides that Easter is celebrated on the first Sunday after the first full moon after the vernal equinox. Arius is exiled to Illyria; his works are confiscated and consigned to the flames.

== Births ==
- Wang Meng (or Jinglüe), Chinese prime minister (d. 375)

== Deaths ==
- c. July – Li Ju (or Shihui), Chinese general and warlord
- October 18 – Ming of Jin, Chinese emperor (b. 299)
- Licinius, deposed Roman emperor (executed)
- Martinian, deposed Roman emperor (executed)
- Tuoba Heru, Chinese prince of the Tuoba Dai
- Approximate date – Iamblichus, Syrian philosopher and writer (b. 245)
