= Consort Zhen =

Consort Zhen may refer to:

== Imperial consorts with the surname Zhen ==
- Lady Zhen (183–221), first wife of Cao Wei's founding emperor Cao Pi
- Empress Zhen (Cao Fang) (died 251), wife of Cao Wei's third emperor Cao Fang
- Empress Zhen (Liao dynasty) (died 951), wife of Emperor Shizong of Liao

== Imperial consorts with the title Consort Zhen ==
- Consort Chang (1808–1860), concubine of the Daoguang Emperor, known as Consort Zhen at one point during their marriage
- Empress Dowager Ci'an (1837–1881), wife of the Xianfeng Emperor, known as Noble Consort Zhen before she became the empress
- Pearl Concubine (1876–1900) or Consort Zhen, concubine of the Guangxu Emperor
