= 252 =

252 in various calendars
- Gregorian calendar: 252; CCLII
- Ab urbe condita: 1005
- Assyrian calendar: 5002
- Balinese saka calendar: 173–174
- Bengali calendar: −342 – −341
- Berber calendar: 1202
- Buddhist calendar: 796
- Burmese calendar: −386
- Byzantine calendar: 5760–5761
- Chinese calendar: 辛未年 (Metal Goat); 2949 or 2742 — to — 壬申年 (Water Monkey); 2950 or 2743
- Coptic calendar: −32 – −31
- Discordian calendar: 1418
- Ethiopian calendar: 244–245
- Hebrew calendar: 4012–4013
- Hindu calendars
- Vikram Samvat: 308–309
- Shaka Samvat: 173–174
- Kali Yuga: 3352–3353
- Holocene calendar: 10252
- Iranian calendar: 370 BP – 369 BP
- Islamic calendar: 381 BH – 380 BH
- Javanese calendar: 130–132
- Julian calendar: 252; CCLII
- Korean calendar: 2585
- Minguo calendar: 1660 before ROC 民前1660年
- Nanakshahi calendar: −1216
- Seleucid era: 563/564 AG
- Thai solar calendar: 794–795
- Tibetan calendar: ལྕགས་མོ་ལུག་ལོ་ (female Iron-Sheep); 378 or −3 or −775 — to — ཆུ་ཕོ་སྤྲེ་ལོ་ (male Water-Monkey); 379 or −2 or −774

Year 252 (CCLII) was a leap year starting on Thursday of the Julian calendar. At the time, it was known as the Year of the Consulship of Trebonianus and Volusianus (or, less frequently, year 1005 Ab urbe condita). The denomination 252 for this year has been used since the early medieval period, when the Anno Domini calendar era became the prevalent method in Europe for naming years.

== Events ==
=== By place ===
==== Roman Empire ====
- Battle of Barbalissos: King Shapur I defeats the Roman army (some 70,000 men) at Barbalissos in Syria (approximate date).

==== Persia ====
- Shapur I puts down the revolt in Khorasan (Iran and Turkmenistan), and rejoins his army.
- Shapur I invades Armenia, and appoints Artavazd VI as the new Armenian king.
- Georgia submits peacefully to Shapur I, and becomes a vassal of the Sassanid Empire.

==== Asia ====
- Sun Liang succeeds his father Sun Quan, as emperor of the Chinese state of Eastern Wu.

=== By topic ===
==== Religion ====
- Pope Cornelius is exiled to Centumcellae, by Emperor Trebonianus Gallus.

== Births ==
- Eusignius of Antioch, Roman general and martyr (d. 362)
- Wang Jun (or Pengzu), Chinese general and warlord (d. 314)
- Wei Huacun, founder of the Shangqing sect of Daoism (d. 334)

== Deaths ==
- May 21 – Sun Quan, founder of the Eastern Wu state (b. 182)
- Pan (or Pan Shu), Chinese empress of the Eastern Wu state
- Tian Yu (or Guorang), Chinese general and politician (b. 171)
- Tiridates II (or Khosrov), Roman client king of Armenia
