= Zhu Jianjun =

Chinese prince (1456–1527)

Zhu Jianjun 朱見浚
- Prince of Ji
- Born: 1456
- Died: 1527 (aged 70–71)
- Spouse: Lady Zhang (m. 1474; died 1485)
- Issue: Zhu Youfu; Princess Shanhua
Posthumous name
- Prince Jian of Ji (Note: simplified Chinese: 吉简王; traditional Chinese: 吉簡王; pinyin: Jí Jiǎnwáng)
- House: Zhu
- Father: Emperor Yingzong
- Mother: Consort Wan

Chinese name
- Traditional Chinese: 朱見浚
- Simplified Chinese: 朱见浚
Transcriptions
Standard Mandarin
- Hanyu Pinyin: Zhū Jiànjùn

Zhu Jianjun (1456–1527) was the seventh son of Emperor Yingzong of Ming. His mother was one of his father's concubines, Consort Wan. He was the first Prince of Ji (吉王).

Zhu Jianjun was born in 1456, during the time when Emperor Yingzong was under house arrest in the Southern Palace. In 1457, Emperor Yingzong was restored to the throne, and in the same year, Zhu Jianjun was given the title of Prince of Ji. On 25 October 1477, he was sent to his princedom in Changsha Prefecture.

Zhu Jianjun was a man of strong moral character who constantly reminded himself to do good deeds. He made a visit to the Yuelu Academy to explore the remains of ancient sages and had a portrait of one of them made, along with a copy of the Book of Documents, which he often looked at. In his free time, he enjoyed writing and also read Jia Dafu Xinshu (賈大傅新書; presumably referring to Jia Yi's Jiazi Xinshu 賈子新書).

After ruling for fifty years, he died in 1527 and was given the posthumous name "Jian" (簡). His heir, Zhu Youfu (朱祐枎), died early and was given the posthumous name "Dao" (悼). His grandson, Zhu Houfu, succeeded him as the Prince of Ji two years later.

His daughter, Princess Shanhua (善化郡主), married Shi Ce (史策).

== Descendants ==
Zhu Jianfan (朱劍凡; 1883–1932) was a close friend of Mao Zedong and a revolutionary educator in China. He was also the father-in-law of Xiao Jingguang and Wang Jiaxiang.

== Notes ==
Zhu Jianjun House of Zhu Born: 1456 Died: 1527
Chinese royalty
New creation	Prince of Ji; 1457–1527	Vacant Title next held by Zhu Houfu
