= Chen Fei (artist) =

Chinese visual artist

Chen Fei (Simplified Chinese:陈飞), born in 1983, Hong Tong, Shanxi Province, China, was trained at the Beijing Film Academy, and in 2005, was graduated from Fine Arts Department. His passion for and extensive knowledge of movies has influenced his choice of subjects and compositional style in his paintings.

== Exhibitions ==
- 2025
  - Grand Lobby, Consortium Museum, Dijon
- 2011
  - Images of Women IX, Schoeni Art Gallery, Hong Kong
  - Art Stage Singapore, Marina Bay Sands, Singapore
- 2010
  - Bad Taste, Schoeni Art Gallery, Hong Kong (solo)
- 2009
  - One-Track Minded, Star Gallery, Beijing (solo)
  - New Works, Star Gallery, Beijing
  - Enliven – In between Realities and Fiction, Animamix Biennale, Today Art Museum, Beijing
  - Niubi Newbie Kids II, Schoeni Art Gallery, Hong Kong
  - SHContemporary 09, Shanghai Exhibition Centre, Shanghai
  - From Zero to Hero, Star Gallery, Beijing
  - My 2009 Dream Art Exhibition, Today Art Museum, Beijing
- 2008
  - Niubi Newbie Kids, Schoeni Art Gallery, Hong Kong
  - CIGE 2008 China International Gallery Exposition, China World Trade Centre, Beijing
  - Superficiality is not our Motto – Post 80’s Art, Star Gallery, Beijing
  - Rebuild – China School Charity’s Artwork Donation Exhibition for the Sichuan Earthquake, Star Gallery, Beijing
  - Finding Oneself, Minsheng Art Museum, Shanghai
  - The Origin – The First Moon River Sculpture Festival, Moon River Art Museum, Beijing
- 2007
  - Gathering Sand Castles - Chinese New Generation Artist Award Exhibition, Yan Huang Art Museum, Beijing
- 2004
  - Chen Fei Solo Oil Painting Exhibition, Beijing Film Academy, Beijing (solo)
