= 314 =

314 in various calendars
- Gregorian calendar: 314; CCCXIV
- Ab urbe condita: 1067
- Assyrian calendar: 5064
- Balinese saka calendar: 235–236
- Bengali calendar: −280 – −279
- Berber calendar: 1264
- Buddhist calendar: 858
- Burmese calendar: −324
- Byzantine calendar: 5822–5823
- Chinese calendar: 癸酉年 (Water Rooster); 3011 or 2804 — to — 甲戌年 (Wood Dog); 3012 or 2805
- Coptic calendar: 30–31
- Discordian calendar: 1480
- Ethiopian calendar: 306–307
- Hebrew calendar: 4074–4075
- Hindu calendars
- Vikram Samvat: 370–371
- Shaka Samvat: 235–236
- Kali Yuga: 3414–3415
- Holocene calendar: 10314
- Iranian calendar: 308 BP – 307 BP
- Islamic calendar: 318 BH – 316 BH
- Javanese calendar: 194–195
- Julian calendar: 314; CCCXIV
- Korean calendar: 2647
- Minguo calendar: 1598 before ROC 民前1598年
- Nanakshahi calendar: −1154
- Seleucid era: 625/626 AG
- Thai solar calendar: 856–857
- Tibetan calendar: ཆུ་མོ་བྱ་ལོ་ (female Water-Bird); 440 or 59 or −713 — to — ཤིང་ཕོ་ཁྱི་ལོ་ (male Wood-Dog); 441 or 60 or −712

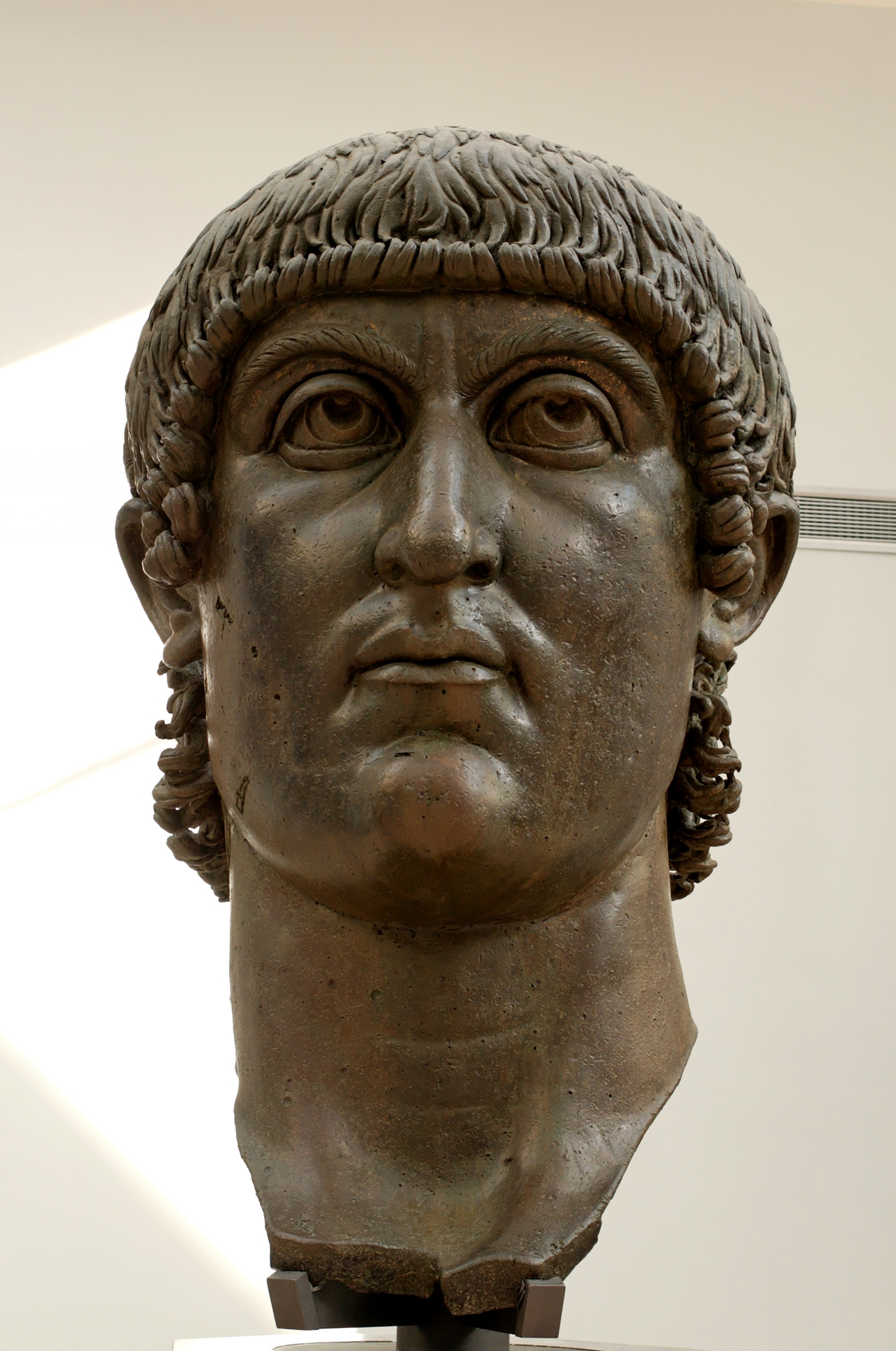
Emperor Constantine the Great

Year 314 (CCCXIV) was a common year starting on Friday of the Julian calendar. At the time, it was known as the Year of the Consulship of Rufius and Annianus (or, less frequently, year 1067 Ab urbe condita). The denomination 314 for this year has been used since the early medieval period, when the Anno Domini calendar era became the prevalent method in Europe for naming years.

== Events ==
=== By place ===
==== Roman Empire ====
- A large Pictish raid southwards in Roman Britain is attempted.

=== By topic ===
==== Religion ====
- January 10 – Pope Miltiades' reign ends.
- January 31 – Pope Sylvester I succeeds Pope Miltiades as the 33rd pope.
- August 30 – Council of Arles: Confirms the pronouncement of Donatism as a schism, and passes other canons.
- Synod of Ancyra: Consulting a magician is declared a sin earning five years of penance.
- Alexander becomes Bishop of Byzantium.

== Births ==
- Libanius, Greek rhetorician and sophist (approximate date)
- Li Qi, Chinese emperor of the Cheng Han Dynasty (d. 338)
- Zhi Dun, Chinese Buddhist monk and philosopher (d. 366)

== Deaths ==
- January 10 – Miltiades (or Melchiades), bishop of Rome
- Liu E (or Lihua), Chinese empress of the Xiongnu state
- Wang Jun (or Pengzu), Chinese general and warlord (b. 252)
- Zhang Gui, Chinese governor and duke of Xiping (b. 255)
