= Consort Zheng =

Consort Zheng or Empress Zheng may refer to:

- Zheng Yingtao (died 349), empress of Shi Hu (Emperor Wu of Later Zhao)
- Empress Dowager Zheng (died 865), concubine to Emperor Xianzong of Tang
- Empress Zheng (Song dynasty) (1079–1130), wife of Emperor Huizong of Song
- Noble Consort Zheng (1565–1630), concubine of the Wanli Emperor
