= 245 =

245 in various calendars
- Gregorian calendar: 245; CCXLV
- Ab urbe condita: 998
- Assyrian calendar: 4995
- Balinese saka calendar: 166–167
- Bengali calendar: −349 – −348
- Berber calendar: 1195
- Buddhist calendar: 789
- Burmese calendar: −393
- Byzantine calendar: 5753–5754
- Chinese calendar: 甲子年 (Wood Rat); 2942 or 2735 — to — 乙丑年 (Wood Ox); 2943 or 2736
- Coptic calendar: −39 – −38
- Discordian calendar: 1411
- Ethiopian calendar: 237–238
- Hebrew calendar: 4005–4006
- Hindu calendars
- Vikram Samvat: 301–302
- Shaka Samvat: 166–167
- Kali Yuga: 3345–3346
- Holocene calendar: 10245
- Iranian calendar: 377 BP – 376 BP
- Islamic calendar: 389 BH – 388 BH
- Javanese calendar: 123–124
- Julian calendar: 245; CCXLV
- Korean calendar: 2578
- Minguo calendar: 1667 before ROC 民前1667年
- Nanakshahi calendar: −1223
- Seleucid era: 556/557 AG
- Thai solar calendar: 787–788
- Tibetan calendar: ཤིང་ཕོ་བྱི་བ་ལོ་ (male Wood-Rat); 371 or −10 or −782 — to — ཤིང་མོ་གླང་ལོ་ (female Wood-Ox); 372 or −9 or −781

Year 245 (CCXLV) was a common year starting on Wednesday of the Julian calendar. At the time, it was known as the Year of the Consulship of Philippus and Titianus (or, less frequently, year 998 Ab urbe condita). The denomination 245 for this year has been used since the early medieval period, when the Anno Domini calendar era became the prevalent method in Europe for naming years.

== Events ==
=== By place ===
==== Roman Empire ====
- Emperor Philip the Arab entrusts Trajan Decius with an important command on the Danube.
- In Britain, many thousands of acres of modern-day Lincolnshire are inundated by a great flood.
- The philosopher Plotinus goes to live in Rome.

==== Asia ====
- Lady Triệu, a Vietnamese warrior, begins her 3-year resistance against the invading Chinese.

== Births ==
- Iamblichus, Syrian Neoplatonist philosopher (approximate date)
- Diocletian, Roman emperor

== Deaths ==
- Ammonius Saccas, Alexandrian-Greek philosopher (approximate date)
- Lu Xun (or Boyan), Chinese general and statesman (b. 183)
- Wu (or Wu Xian), Chinese empress of the Shu Han state
- Wu Can (or Kongxiu), Chinese official and politician
- Zhao Yan (or Boran), Chinese official and general (b. 171)
- Zhang Xiu (or Shusi), Chinese general and statesman (b. 205)
