= Cheng Xia =

Later Zhao minister (died 333)

- 程遐

Prefect of Changle (長樂太守)
- In office ?–?
- Monarch: Liu Cong

General Who Calms the Northern Frontier (寧朔將軍)
- In office 316–?
- Monarch: Liu Cong

Chief Clerk of the Right (右長史)
- In office 322–330
- Monarch: Shi Le

Supervisor of the Right (右僕射)
- In office 330–333
- Monarch: Shi Le/Shi Hong

Personal details
- Born: Unknown
- Died: 333
- Relations: Empress Dowager Cheng (sister); Shi Hong (nephew)

Cheng Xia (died 333) was a Chinese minister of Later Zhao during the Sixteen Kingdoms period. His sister, Consort Cheng, was a concubine of Shi Le, founding emperor of Later Zhao and also the mother to the Crown Prince Shi Hong. As Shi Le's brother-in-law, he was thus given an important role in the Later Zhao administration. He was also strong opposition to Shi Le's powerful nephew, Shi Hu, who he feared would usurp the throne once Shi Le passes. His attempts at diminishing Shi Hu's influence captured his scorn, and after he launched a coup in 333 following Shi Le's death, Shi Hu had Cheng Xia and his ally Xu Guang executed.

== Life ==
=== Early career ===
Cheng Xia joined Shi Le while the latter was raising an army in modern Hebei. His sister was Consort Cheng who married Shi Le and gave birth to Shi Le's soon-to-be heir, Shi Hong. Cheng Xia's first known positions in Shi Le's administration was the Prefect of Changle and Marshal of the Right. In 315, he assisted Shi Le in his campaign against the rebel, Wang Gen (王眘). After Shi Le occupied all of Jizhou in 316, Cheng Xia was promoted to General Who Calms The Northern Frontier and Chief Controller of seven counties in Jizhou. In 319, Cheng Xia was one of many who urged Shi Le to claim the imperial title, although this was rejected.

=== As Shi Le's Chief Clerk of the Right ===
In 322, Shi Le's most favourite advisor, Zhang Bin died. Cheng Xia replaced him as the new Chief Clerk of the Right. However, Shi Le did not like Cheng Xia as much as he did with Zhang Bin as the two men were constantly at disagreement with each other. It is said that every time Shi Le disagreed with Cheng Xia, he would sigh and say, "The Right Marquess abandoned me and let me work with this man. Was it not cruel for him to do so?"

Cheng Xia advised Shi Le in 326 to garrison troops in the palaces in Ye. Shi Le assigned the thirteen-year-old Shi Hong to take command of the army in Ye with assistance from the general Wang Yang (王陽). Shi Hu took offence from this decision as he believed that he deserved full control over Ye due to his merits in Shi Le's conquest. Hu was forced to move his family and households under him out of Ye, but he built the Three Terrace near the city, where he relocated them. He also violently retaliated by having his soldiers dressed up as bandits to raid Cheng Xia's household, where they violated the women inside and stole their clothes.

The following year in 328, Shi Le personally led a campaign against his rival, Liu Yao of Han-Zhao in Luoyang after Shi Hu failed to subdue him. Cheng Xia and a number of ministers opposed this decision, believing that Liu Yao's demise was certain even without Le's presence. Shi Le was angry at their remonstration, drawing his sword and shouting at them until they left. With help from a compliant minister, Xu Guang, Shi Le's campaign ended in success with Shi Le even capturing Liu Yao himself.

Han-Zhao was annihilated in 329 with the defeat and death of Liu Yao's princes, Liu Yin and Liu Xi. In 330, Shi Le claimed the title of Heavenly King. Appointments were handed out, with Cheng Xia becoming Supervisor of the Right and acting Supervisor of the Masters of Writing.

That same year, the Jin dynasty rebel, Zu Yue had fled to Later Zhao after loyalist forces had defeated his army. Shi Le did not like him but still entertained him initially. This soon changed as Cheng Xia, believing Zu Yue to be an untrustworthy general, advised Shi Le to execute Zu and his family before he could revolt. Cheng Xia's advice was backed by the general Yao Yizhong, and Shi Le eventually agreed. Cheng Xia invited Zu Yue and his family to a banquet where Shi Le had them arrested and later executed.

=== Opposing Shi Hu and death ===
With most of northern China under Later Zhao's control, Cheng Xia once more sought to reduce Shi Hu's influence, which he saw was growing day by day. In 332, he approached Shi Le and expressed his concerns over Later Zhao's future. Pointing out Shi Hu's ruthlessness and military prowess, Cheng believed that Hu would not submit to Shi Le's young heir, Shi Hong, after Le's death. However, Shi Le dismissed these concerns as Cheng being worried about not having sole control over Hong. Shi Le felt that Shi Hu was still a vital asset for Shi Hong's future military campaigns, and at the same time assured Cheng with a lofty position in Hong's court.

An emotional Cheng attempted to rebuke Shi Le's presumptions of him but was once more ignored. After failing to convince Shi Le, Cheng Xia went to Xu Guang (who had also tried to curb Shi Hu's influence), warning him of impending harm in the hands of Shi Hu. Hearing this, Xu also approached Shi Le with the same intent as Cheng did, only this time with some success. However, this was not enough to stop Shi Hu entirely.

After Shi Le's death on August 17, 333, Shi Hu immediately had Shi Hong placed under his control through a coup. Cheng Xia and Xu Guang were arrested and brought before the Minister of Justice. Due to his grudge, the two were excluded from Shi Hu's general amnesty and executed instead.
