= Xu Guang (Later Zhao) =

Later Zhao minister (died 333)

- 徐光

Recordskeeping Army Advisor (記室參軍)
- In office ?–326
- Monarch: Shi Le

Prefect of the Palace Secretariat (中書令)
- In office 330–333
- Monarch: Shi Le/Shi Hong

Personal details
- Born: Unknown Qingfeng County, Henan
- Died: 333
- Parent: Xu Cong (father)
- Courtesy name: Jiwu (季武)

Xu Guang (died 333), courtesy name Jiwu, was a minister of Later Zhao during the Sixteen Kingdoms period. He was captured by Shi Le's general Wang Yang (王陽) and served as a servant, but after discovering his potential, he was recruited into Shi Le's army instead. Misconducts by Xu Guang angered Shi Le who had him and family imprisoned in 326. However, Xu Guang won Shi Le's favour back in 328, after his advice earned them a victory over Zhao's rival Han-Zhao. As he became a prominent member of the administration, Xu Guang tried to reduce the power of Shi Le's nephew, Shi Hu but could not convince Shi Le to fully remove him. Shi Hu resented him for this, and after his coup in 333, Shi Hu had him and his ally Cheng Xia executed.

== Early life and background ==
Xu Guang was from Dunqiu County in Dong Commandery. He grew up poor and his father Xu Cong (徐聰) only worked as a mere cow doctor. Despite his poor upbringing, he took a liking for studying and reciting literature. As northern China fell into chaos, the Han-Zhao general, Shi Le, invaded Dunqiu. His general Wang Yang captured the county, where he took in a 13-year-old Xu Guang as a servant. Xu Guang was ordered to work in Wang Yang's stables, where he would tend to the horses. Xu Guang had no interest in his new work, and instead spent the rest of his time writing poetry and songs on the posts tied to the horses.

Wang Yang eventually found out of Xu Guang's procrastination. Angered, he had him imprisoned and whipped. However, after his release, Wang Yang felt guilty after being informed that Xu Guang had cried all night long. Wang Yang summoned Xu Guang and handed him a brush and paper, which Xu Guang wrote an ode on. Wang Yang was impressed by Xu Guang's talents and rewarded him with robes. He also recommended him to Shi Le, who agreed to appoint him into his administration.

== Career under Shi Le ==
=== Early career ===
In 314, Xu Guang followed Shi Le in his Youzhou campaign to capture the Jin dynasty warlord, Wang Jun. The Book of Jin states that after Jicheng fell and Wang Jun was captured, Shi Le had Xu Guang chastise Wang and list his crimes against the people of his domain. In 320, Xu Guang was made Shi Le's envoy to Shao Xu, another Jin warlord who has just been captured. Xu Guang questioned Shao Xu in Shi Le's words regarding his insistence to remain loyal to Jin and was given a satisfactory response for Shi.

=== Battle of Luoyang ===
Xu Guang was serving as Records Keeping Army Advisor by 326. That year, Xu Guang ran into trouble when, one day, Shi Le summoned him to court but Xu did not answer as he was too drunk. Shi Le thus demoted him to a standard official. On a later occasion, Xu Guang was attending Shi Le, during which he displayed an irritated look. Shi Le noticed his lack of respect and was angered. He had Xu Guang and his wife thrown into prison because of this.

Xu Guang remained in prison until 328, when Shi Le was leading his final campaign against his rival, Liu Yao of Han-Zhao. Shi Le was frustrated by his officials who opposed his decision to personally lead the campaign. With his court against him, he looked towards Xu Guang. Shi Le freed and pardoned him before asking for his advice. Xu assured Shi Le that Liu Yao was nothing to fear, as evident of Liu wasting his momentum on Luoyang instead of Later Zhao's capital, Xiangguo. Shi Le was pleased and laughingly said, "It is just as Xu Guang says!"

Xu Guang followed Shi Le during the assault on Luoyang. As Xu had predicted, Shi Le overcame Liu Yao and even captured him in battle. The last remaining resistance of Han-Zhao's forces were defeated in 329. The following year in 330, Shi Le declared himself Heavenly King and handed out appointments to his officials. Xu Guang in particular became Prefect of the Palace Secretariat and acting Custodian of the Private Library.

=== Later life, opposing Shi Hu and death ===
Later that year, Shi Le was worried about his Crown Prince Shi Hong, who was not as militaristic as his father. Xu Guang told him not to worry much about it, comparing the father and son relationship of Shi Le and Shi Hong to that of Emperor Gaozu and Emperor Wen of Han, as the former unified the state through war while the latter established peace in his rule. Shi Le was satisfied with the answer but Xu Guang furthered their conversation by bringing up Shi's powerful nephew, Shi Hu. Xu Guang urged Shi Le to reduce his power while increasing that of Shi Hong's as he feared that Hu would go against Hong in the future. Shi Le considered his advice but never acted upon it at the time.

In 331, Shi Le intended to construct a new palace in Ye. However, he was opposed by his Minister of Justice, Xu Xian (續咸). Shi Le was angry and wanted to execute him, but Xu Guang intervened and told him that Xu Xian was only giving honest criticism. Shi Le realized this and did not carry out the execution. Instead, he rewarded Xu Xian and delayed the start of the construction.

In 332, Shi Le held a banquet at the beginning of the year. He asked Xu Guang which rulers could he be compared with. Xu Guang remarked that Shi Le's talents and prowess surpassed that of Emperor Gaozu of Han, which made Shi Le laugh and tell Xu that he had overestimated him. Shi Le believes himself to be lower than Emperor Gaozu but equal to Emperor Guangwu of Han. He concluded his evaluation by condemning the likes of Cao Cao and Sima Yi, who he said "bullied orphans and widows" and took power through deception. The ministers present kowtowed and chanted "Long live the emperor!"

Some time later, the minister Cheng Xia attempted to persuade Shi Le into reducing Shi Hu's power, which grew by the day. After failing to do so, Cheng Xia, remembering Xu Guang's past attempt at doing the same, approached Xu and warned him of Shi Hu's grudge against them. Xu was once again determined to undermine Shi Hu. That same day, when Shi Le was worried about his legacy, Xu Guang dissipated Le's doubt and at the same time, took the opportunity to convince Le into shifting his worries towards Shi Hu.

Xu Guang was successful and Shi Le began taking steps to empower Shi Hong. Shi Le allowed Hong to review petitions from ministers and had the Palace Regular Attendant, Yan Zhen (嚴震) to act as Hong's supervisor. However, this was not enough to completely stop Shi Hu. Shi Hu eventually found out about the incident and heavily resented Xu Guang because of it. Shi Le died on the 17th of August in 333. Almost immediately, Shi Hu seized Shi Hong and took over the government. Xu Guang and Cheng Xia were arrested by Shi Hu and brought before the Minister of Justice. Shi Hu granted a general amnesty but left out Xu Guang and Cheng Xia, who were both executed for defying him.
