= Consort Chen (Yingzong) =

Consort Jingzhuangan'muchen 靖莊安穆宸妃
- Consort Chen
- Born: 1431
- Died: 22 December 1467 (aged 35–36); Forbidden City, Beijing
- Burial: Jinshan
- Spouse: Emperor Yingzong of Ming (d.1464)
- Issue: Zhu Jianlin, Prince Zhuang of De; Zhu Jianshi; Zhu Jianjun, Prince Jian of Ji; Zhu Jianzhi, Prince Mu of Xin; Princess Chun'an; Princess Guangde
Posthumous name
- Jingzhuangan'mu (靖莊安穆)
- Clan: Wan (萬)
- Father: Wan Ju (萬聚)

Consort Chen (宸妃 萬氏; 1431 – 22 December 1467), of the Wan clan, was the favorite consort of Emperor Yingzong of Ming.

== Biography ==
Her father, Wan Ju (萬聚), was originally a soldier in the Zhuolu guard (涿鹿衛). She was born in 1431 and was elected to enter the inner court in 1443. Later, she became a concubine of Emperor Yingzong. In 1448, she gave birth to Zhu Jianlin, Prince of De; and in the following year, prince Zhu Jianshi was born. After the Tumu Crisis, Emperor Yingzong returned to Beijing and was put under house arrest in the Southern Palace (南宫). Lady Wan lived here with Yingzong. In 1454, she gave birth to Princess Guangde; before that, she gave birth to a daughter, Princess Chun'an; and in 1456, she gave birth to Zhu Jianjun, Prince of Ji. In 1457, after the restoration of Emperor Yingzong, Lady Wan was granted the title "Consort Chen", and in 1458 she gave birth to Zhu Jianzhi, Prince Mu of Xin.

Consort Chen died in 1467 and was granted the posthumous title "Consort Jingzhuanganmuchen" (靖莊安穆宸妃). She was thirty-seven years old and was buried in Jinshan.

== Titles ==
- During the reign of the Xuande Emperor (r. 1425–1435):
  - Lady Wan (萬氏; from 1431)
- During the reign of the Zhengtong Emperor (r. 1435–1449):
  - Concubine (嬪; from unknown date)
- During the reign of the Tianshun Emperor (r. 1457–1464):
  - Consort Chen (宸妃; from 1457)
  - Consort Jingzhuanganmuchen (靖莊安穆宸妃; from 1467)

== Issue ==
- As a concubine:
  - Zhu Jianlin, Prince Zhuang of De (德莊王 朱見潾; 7 May 1448 – 7 September 1517), Emperor Yingzong's second son
  - Zhu Jianshi (朱見湜; 2 August 1449 – 30 August 1451), Emperor Yingzong's third son
  - Princess Chun'an (淳安公主; 1453-1536), Emperor Yingzong's third daughter
  - Princess Guangde (廣德公主; 1454–1484), personal name Yanxiang (延祥), Emperor Yingzong's fifth daughter
  - Zhu Jianjun, Prince Jian of Ji (吉簡王 朱見浚; 11 July 1456 – 16 August 1527), Emperor Yingzong's seventh son
- As Consort Chen:
  - Zhu Jianzhi, Prince Mu of Xin (忻穆王 朱見治; 18 March 1458 – 2 April 1472), Emperor Yingzong's eighth son
