= Empress Liu (Shi Le's wife) =

Empress Liu (Chinese: 劉皇后; personal name unknown) (died c.October 333) was an empress consort of China's Later Zhao dynasty during the Sixteen Kingdoms period. Her husband was the founder of the empire, Shi Le (Emperor Ming).

== Life ==
During the time that Shi Le was a Han-Zhao general and later as the ruler of his own independent state, she was described as having both bravery and wisdom, often participating in Shi Le's military decisions and helpful to him. She was therefore compared to the Han dynasty Empress Lü Zhi, who provided similar assistance her husband Emperor Gao of Han, but traditional historians praised Lady Liu for not being jealous as Empress Lü was. In an unknown year, a man named Zhang Bi (張裨) rebelled against Shi Le in Xiangcheng. Lady Liu drew her sword and personally killed Zhang Bi, ending his rebellion.

In 330, after Shi Le declared himself Heavenly King (Tian Wang), he created her queen, and later that year, after he declared himself emperor, she was created empress. However, Shi Le's heir, Shi Hong, was not Empress Liu's biological son, but rather that of Consort Cheng.

In 333, after Shi Le's death, his nephew Shi Hu the Prince of Zhongshan quickly seized power in a coup d'état and controlled the government in the name of Shi Hong. Empress Dowager Liu, seeing how quickly Shi Hu appeared to be intent on usurping the throne, conspired with Shi Le's adopted son Shi Kan (石堪) the Prince of Pengcheng to start a rebellion to overthrow Shi Hu. In fall 333, Shi Kan escaped outside of the capital Xiangguo (襄國, in modern Xintai, Hebei) and tried to seize Linqiu (廩丘, in modern Puyang, Henan) but was unable to. He was then captured by Shi Hu's forces and burned to death. Soon, Empress Dowager Liu's involvement was discovered, and she was deposed and executed by Shi Hu.

Chinese royalty
Preceded by None (dynasty founded)	Empress of Later Zhao; 330–333	Succeeded by Empress Zheng Yingtao
Preceded by Yang Xianrong of Han Zhao	Empress of China (Northern/Central); 330–333	Succeeded by Empress Zheng Yingtao
Preceded by Liu Fang of Han Zhao	Empress of China (Western); 330–333	Succeeded by Empress Zheng Yingtao
