= 288 =

288 in various calendars
Gregorian calendar	288; CCLXXXVIII
Ab urbe condita	1041
Assyrian calendar	5038
Balinese saka calendar	209–210
Bengali calendar	−306 – −305
Berber calendar	1238
Buddhist calendar	832
Burmese calendar	−350
Byzantine calendar	5796–5797
Chinese calendar	丁未年 (Fire Goat); 2985 or 2778 — to — 戊申年 (Earth Monkey); 2986 or 2779
Coptic calendar	4–5
Discordian calendar	1454
Ethiopian calendar	280–281
Hebrew calendar	4048–4049
- Hindu calendars
Vikram Samvat	344–345
Shaka Samvat	209–210
Kali Yuga	3388–3389
Holocene calendar	10288
Iranian calendar	334 BP – 333 BP
Islamic calendar	344 BH – 343 BH
Javanese calendar	168–169
Julian calendar	288; CCLXXXVIII
Korean calendar	2621
Minguo calendar	1624 before ROC 民前1624年
Nanakshahi calendar	−1180
Seleucid era	599/600 AG
Thai solar calendar	830–831
Tibetan calendar	མེ་མོ་ལུག་ལོ་ (female Fire-Sheep); 414 or 33 or −739 — to — ས་ཕོ་སྤྲེ་ལོ་ (male Earth-Monkey); 415 or 34 or −738

Year 288 (CCLXXXVIII) was a leap year starting on Sunday of the Julian calendar. In the Roman Empire, it was known as the Year of the Consulship of Maximian and Lanuarianus (or, less frequently, year 1041 Ab urbe condita). The denomination 288 for this year has been used since the early medieval period, when the Anno Domini calendar era became the prevalent method in Europe for naming years.

== Events ==
=== By place ===
==== Roman Empire ====
- Emperor Diocletian launches a campaign into Germanic territory from the province of Raetia (Switzerland).
- Around this time, an army loyal to Maximian, probably led by the future emperor Constantius, defeats the usurper Carausius or his Frankish allies in northern Gaul. In this or the following year, Carausius withdraws his military forces and administrative presence from Gaul, confining himself to Roman Britain.
- Maximian makes an alliance with the Frankish king Gennobaudes.
- Far from Carausius' fleet, in the rivers of Gaul, Maximian builds a fleet to contest control of the North Sea and re-take Britain.
- Around this time, Constantius marries Maximian's stepdaughter, Theodora, and it may also be around this time that the general Galerius marries Diocletian's daughter Galeria Valeria.

== Births ==
- Li Ban, Chinese emperor of Cheng Han (d. 334)
- Wen Jiao (or Taizhen), Chinese politician (d. 329)

== Deaths ==
- Maximilian of Lorch, Christian missionary and martyr
- Sebastian, Roman soldier and Christian martyr
- Teng Xiu, Chinese general and governor
