= 416 BC =

416 BC in various calendars
Gregorian calendar	416 BC; CDXVI BC
Ab urbe condita	338
Ancient Egypt era	XXVII dynasty, 110
Pharaoh	Darius II of Persia, 8
Ancient Greek Olympiad (summer)	91st Olympiad (victor)¹
Assyrian calendar	4335
Balinese saka calendar	N/A
Bengali calendar	−1009 – −1008
Berber calendar	535
Buddhist calendar	129
Burmese calendar	−1053
Byzantine calendar	5093–5094
Chinese calendar	甲子年 (Wood Rat); 2282 or 2075 — to — 乙丑年 (Wood Ox); 2283 or 2076
Coptic calendar	−699 – −698
Discordian calendar	751
Ethiopian calendar	−423 – −422
Hebrew calendar	3345–3346
- Hindu calendars
Vikram Samvat	−359 – −358
Shaka Samvat	N/A
Kali Yuga	2685–2686
Holocene calendar	9585
Iranian calendar	1037 BP – 1036 BP
Islamic calendar	1069 BH – 1068 BH
Javanese calendar	N/A
Julian calendar	N/A
Korean calendar	1918
Minguo calendar	2327 before ROC 民前2327年
Nanakshahi calendar	−1883
Thai solar calendar	127–128
Tibetan calendar	阳木鼠年 (male Wood-Rat) −289 or −670 or −1442 — to — 阴木牛年 (female Wood-Ox) −288 or −669 or −1441

Year 416 BC was a year of the pre-Julian Roman calendar. At the time, it was known as the Year of the Tribunate of Atratinus, Ambustus, Mugillanus and Rutilus (or, less frequently, year 338 Ab urbe condita). The denomination 416 BC for this year has been used since the early medieval period, when the Anno Domini calendar era became the prevalent method in Europe for naming years.

== Events ==
=== By place ===
==== Greece ====
- With the encouragement of Alcibiades, the Athenians take the island of Melos (which has remained neutral during the Peloponnesian War). Its inhabitants are treated with great cruelty by the Athenians, with captured adult men being killed and the women and children made slaves.
- In Sicily, the Ionian city of Segesta asks for Athenian help from the Dorian city of Selinus (which is supported by the powerful Sicilian city of Syracuse). The people of Syracuse are ethnically Dorian (as are the Spartans), while the Athenians, and their allies in Sicily, are Ionian. The Athenians feel obliged to assist their ally and therefore prepare an armada to attack Sicily.

=== By topic ===
==== Drama ====
- According to Plato's Symposium, the tragedian Agathon wins first prize at the Lenaia.
- Agathon along with Alcibiades and Socrates and Aristophanes and others attend a symposium described by Plato.
