= Calocaerus =

- Usurper of the Roman Empire
- Reign: 334
- Predecessor: Constantine I
- Successor: Constantine I
- Born: Unknown
- Died: 334; Tarsus, Cilicia
Names
- Calocaerus
Regnal name
- Imperator Caesar Calocaerus Augustus
- Dynasty: None

Calocaerus (Greek: Καλόκαιρος; died 334 AD) was a Roman usurper against Emperor Constantine I, who, in 334, staged a revolt in Cyprus. The revolt was quickly put down, and he was executed along with his commanders, by being burned alive.

== History ==
According to historian Aurelius Victor, before the revolt, Calocaerus had served in the role of Magister pecoris camelorum ("Master of the Flock and Camels") in Cyprus. Whether his unusual title implies some military command ("captain of the camel corps") or merely a servile position ("leading shepherd slave") is uncertain, though in any event there were no camels in Cyprus in that era. He had been assigned to this position by Emperor Constantine I in 330. During the time period of the revolt, imperial power and legitimacy was based almost entirely upon military power. To become and remain emperor, a usurper needed a large and loyal army. Due to this, there were a large number of ephemeral revolts, which were either rapidly put down by the incumbent emperor, or else had their usurper killed by his own troops.

Calocaerus revolted in Cyprus in 334, proclaiming himself emperor. He was swiftly defeated by Flavius Dalmatius, the half-brother of Emperor Constantine I. After being defeated, he was taken to Tarsus in Cilicia, and burned alive, along with his commanders. It is likely that Calocaerus' low status (that of a magister pecoris camelorum), had an influence in the low amount of support he received, leading to his quick demise. Dalmatius gathered evidence that a bastard son of Licinius, who had been emperor before Constantine I, was involved. This son had been legitimized by edict, and survived the downfall of his father, and still held a high, although unrecorded, rank in the Roman Empire. Dalmatius used this evidence to either execute or enslave the bastard son.
