= Empress Dowager Cheng =

Chinese Empress dowager

Empress Dowager Cheng (程太后, personal name unknown) (died c.December 334) was an empress dowager of the Jie-led Later Zhao dynasty of China. She was a concubine of Later Zhao's founding emperor Shi Le and gave birth to his crown prince and successor, Shi Hong. Her brother Cheng Xia was one of Shi Le's key advisors, particularly after Zhang Bin's death.

Cheng Xia was once close to an official named Zhang Pi, but after Zhang Bin promoted and recommended Zhang Pi, Cheng Xia became apprehensive that Zhang Pi was alienating him and Zhang Bin was too powerful. As he wanted to establish his authority in the court, he let Consort Cheng frame Zhang Pi as a favorable knight-errant that would harm the society and should be removed. So Shi Le executed Zhang Pi and Zhang Bin dared not to beg his mercy.

In 330, Shi Le created Shi Hong his crown prince, which angered his powerful nephew Shi Hu, who secretly referred Shi Hong as "son of a maid".

After Shi Le died in August 333, Shi Hu quickly seized power in a coup d'état and killed Cheng Xia and another key advisor of Shi Le, Xu Guang (徐光). Shi Le's wife Empress Dowager Liu tried to start rebellions to overthrow Shi Hu, but could not and was herself killed. After her death, Consort Cheng was made empress dowager, but neither she nor her son had any real power. In late 334, Shi Hu seized the throne and imprisoned her, Shi Hong, and Shi Hong's brothers Shi Hong (石宏, note different character) the Prince of Qin and Shi Hui (石恢) the Prince of Nanyang in Chongxun Palace, but soon had all of them executed.
