= Shi Hong =

Shi Hong 石弘

Emperor of Later Zhao
- Reign: 333–334
- Predecessor: Shi Le
- Successor: Shi Hu
- Born: 314
- Died: 335
Names
- Family name: Shí (石); Given name: Hóng (弘)
Era name and dates
- Yánxī (延熙): 334
- House: Shi
- Dynasty: Later Zhao
- Father: Shi Le
- Mother: Lady Cheng

Shi Hong (石弘) (314 – c.December 334), courtesy name Daya (大雅), was briefly an emperor of the Jie-led Later Zhao dynasty of China after the death of his father Shi Le, Later Zhao's founder. Because after his cousin Shi Hu deposed him, he was created the Prince of Haiyang (海陽王), he is sometimes known by that title.

== Background ==
Shi Hong was Shi Le's second son, by his concubine Consort Cheng. Unlike the militaristic Shi Le, Shi Hong was known for his literary studies and kindness. After his older brother Shi Xing (石興) died, Shi Le made him his heir apparent. In 330, after Shi Le declared himself first "Heavenly King" (Tian Wang) and then emperor, he created Shi Hong crown prince. Shi Le, concerned that his powerful nephew Shi Hu, a ferocious general, had too much power, began to transfer some of Shi Hu's power to Shi Hong, but this only served to aggravate Shi Hu, who already resented Shi Hong for being younger but yet crown prince, believing that, as the general who contributed the most to Shi Le's campaign successes, he should be crown prince.

== Reign ==
In fall of 333, Shi Le died, and Shi Hu immediately seized power in a coup d'état. In fear, Shi Hong offered to yield the throne to Shi Hu, but Shi Hu refused and forced Shi Hong to assume the throne and make him prime minister, and Shi Hong did so. Shi Hu killed Shi Le's advisors Cheng Xia, Shi Hong's uncle, and Xu Guang. Shi Hu further forced Shi Hong to create him the Prince of Wei, with intent to echo the powers that Cao Cao had while being Emperor Xian of Han's regent.

Shi Le's wife Empress Dowager Liu decided to take a chance. She conspired with Shi Le's adopted son Shi Kan (石堪) the Prince of Pengcheng to start a rebellion against Shi Hu, but Shi Kan was defeated and executed cruelly by burning. Empress Dowager Liu, after her role was discovered, was also executed. Shi Hong's mother Consort Cheng assumed the empress dowager title. Shi Hu also subsequently defeated the efforts by Shi Sheng (石生) the Prince of Hedong, Shi Lang (石朗), and Guo Quan (郭權) to overthrow him. In 334, unable to stand Shi Hu's persecution, Shi Hong personally visited Shi Hu and offered him the throne and the imperial seal, and Shi Hu refused—making it clear that it would be his initiative, not Shi Hong's, if he wanted the throne. Shi Hong returned to the palace and cried to Empress Dowager Cheng that the descendants of Shi Le would be exterminated. Soon thereafter, claiming that Shi Hong had violated the customs on mourning, Shi Hu deposed Shi Hong and demoted Shi Hong to the title of the Prince of Haiyang and imprisoned Shi Hong along with Empress Dowager Cheng and his brothers Shi Hong (石宏, note different character) the Prince of Qin and Shi Hui (石恢) the Prince of Nanyang in Chongxun Palace, and soon executed them. Shi Le's descendants were, by this point, exterminated by Shi Hu.

== Personal information ==
- Father
  - Shi Le (Emperor Ming)
- Mother
  - Consort Cheng

Prince of Haiyang House of Shi Born: 313 Died: 334
Regnal titles
Preceded by Shi Le	Emperor of Later Zhao; 333–334	Succeeded by Shi Hu
Titles in pretence
Preceded by Shi Le	— TITULAR — Emperor of China; 333–334; Reason for succession failure: Sixteen Kingdoms	Succeeded by Shi Hu
