= 416 =

416 in various calendars
- Gregorian calendar: 416; CDXVI
- Ab urbe condita: 1169
- Assyrian calendar: 5166
- Balinese saka calendar: 337–338
- Bengali calendar: −178 – −177
- Berber calendar: 1366
- Buddhist calendar: 960
- Burmese calendar: −222
- Byzantine calendar: 5924–5925
- Chinese calendar: 乙卯年 (Wood Rabbit); 3113 or 2906 — to — 丙辰年 (Fire Dragon); 3114 or 2907
- Coptic calendar: 132–133
- Discordian calendar: 1582
- Ethiopian calendar: 408–409
- Hebrew calendar: 4176–4177
- Hindu calendars
- Vikram Samvat: 472–473
- Shaka Samvat: 337–338
- Kali Yuga: 3516–3517
- Holocene calendar: 10416
- Iranian calendar: 206 BP – 205 BP
- Islamic calendar: 212 BH – 211 BH
- Javanese calendar: 300–301
- Julian calendar: 416; CDXVI
- Korean calendar: 2749
- Minguo calendar: 1496 before ROC 民前1496年
- Nanakshahi calendar: −1052
- Seleucid era: 727/728 AG
- Thai solar calendar: 958–959
- Tibetan calendar: ཤིང་མོ་ཡོས་ལོ་ (female Wood-Hare); 542 or 161 or −611 — to — མེ་ཕོ་འབྲུག་ལོ་ (male Fire-Dragon); 543 or 162 or −610

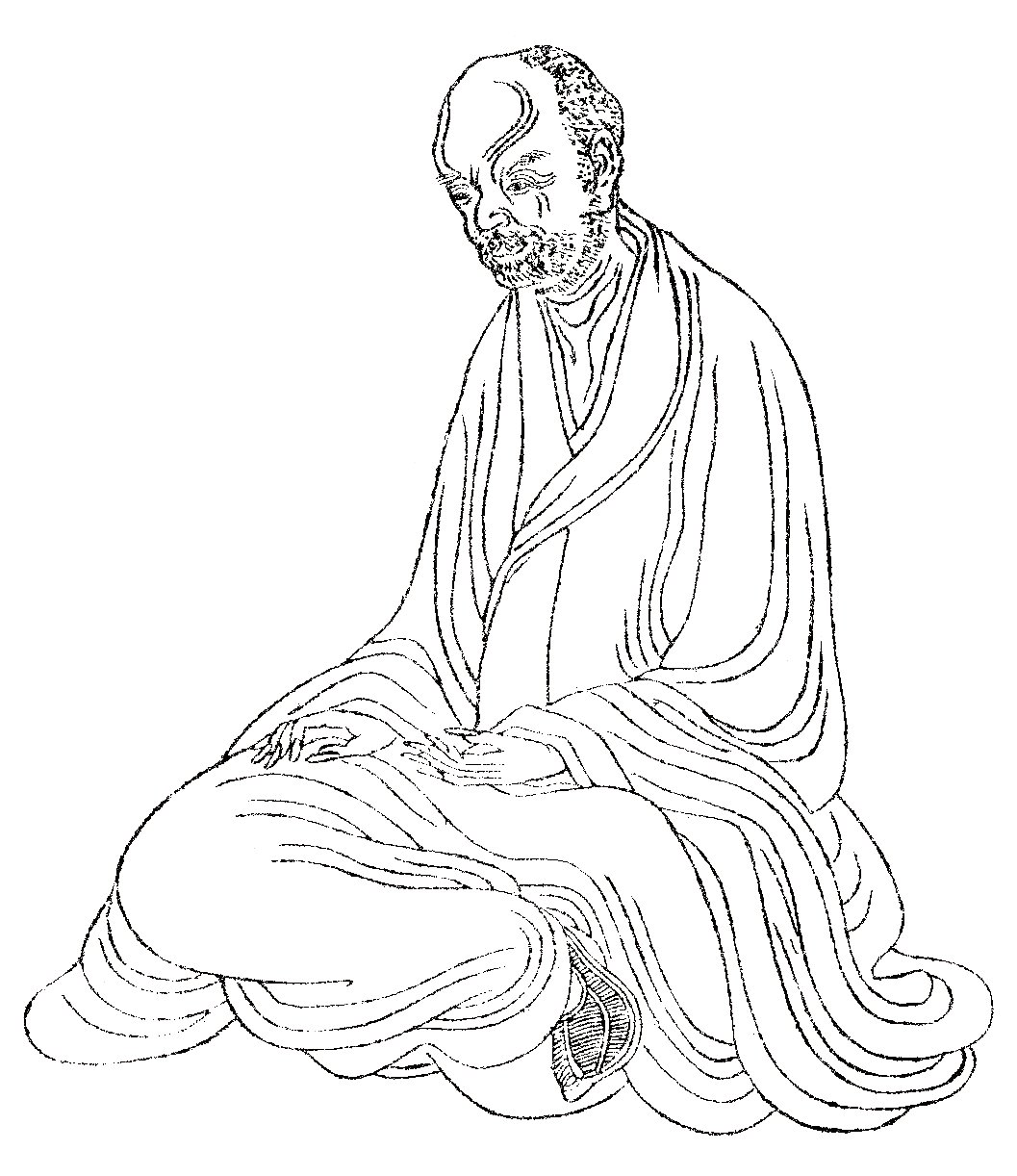
Huiyuan (Buddhist)

Year 416 (CDXVI) was a leap year starting on Saturday of the Julian calendar. At the time, it was known as the Year of the Consulship of Theodosius and Palladius (or, less frequently, year 1169 Ab urbe condita). The denomination 416 for this year has been used since the early medieval period, when the Anno Domini calendar era became the prevalent method in Europe for naming years.

== Events ==
=== By place ===
==== Roman Empire ====
- Priscus Attalus, Roman usurper, is forced to participate in a triumph celebrated by Emperor Honorius, in the streets of Rome. After the festivities, he is exiled to the Lipari Islands (north of Sicily).

==== Europe ====
- The Visigoths continue their invasion of Hispania, and take control of Tarraconensis. King Wallia occupies the gold mines at Las Médulas, and forces Jewish citizens to convert to Christianity.

==== Asia ====
- Reports of the eruption of Krakatoa are recorded in a Javanese historical chronicle called the Book of Kings.

=== By topic ===
==== Arts and Sciences ====
- Rutilius Claudius Namatianus begins his journey home from Rome to Gaul. This becomes the subject of his unfinished poem, De Reditu Suo.

== Deaths ==
- Huiyuan, Buddhist teacher and founder of the Donglin Temple (b. 334)
- Lü Long, last emperor of the Chinese Di state Later Liang
- Yao Xing, emperor of the Qiang state Later Qin (b. 366)
