= Family tree of Chinese monarchs (221 BCE – 453 CE) =

This is a family tree of Chinese monarchs from the foundation of the Qin dynasty in 221 BC until the end of the Sixteen Kingdoms period (ending with the destruction of Northern Liang's rump state by latter half of the 5th century AD).

Family trees of Chinese monarchs
- (ancient)
- (Spring and Autumn period)
- (Warring States period)
- (early)
- (middle)
- (late)

== Qin dynasty ==
The Qin dynasty was established in 221 BC after Qin Shi Huang, King of Qin, conquered his final independent neighbour, the state of Qi. It is now recognised as the first Chinese imperial dynasty in the modern sense of the term; in recognition of this, its rulers were for the first time titled "Emperor" (皇帝), a title of which the components are drawn from legend, higher than the previous title "King" (王). The ancestral name of the family was Ying (嬴), although it is anachronistic to regard this as a family name in the modern sense: it would not have been used together with a given name. The titles of the Qin emperors were literally regnal numbers: "Qin Shi Huang" (秦始皇), in full "Qin Shi Huangdi" (秦始皇帝) means literally "the first Emperor of Qin", "Qin Er Shi" (秦二世), in full "Qin Er Shi Huangdi" (秦二世皇帝) means "the second Emperor of Qin", and so forth.

Qin dynasty

See Family tree of Qin
Zheng 政 259–210 BC King of Qin 秦王 r. 247–221 BC Qin Shi Huang 秦始皇 r. 221–210 BC
1	18 or 25 (disputed)
Fusu 扶蘇 d. 210 BC	Huhai 胡亥; 229–207 BC Qin Er Shi 秦二世 r. 210–207 BC
Ziying 子嬰 d. 206 BC King of Qin r. 207 BC

== Han dynasty and Three Kingdoms ==
=== Han dynasty, Xin dynasty and Shu Han ===
Emperor Xian, the last emperor of the Han dynasty, was a descendant of the first emperor Liu Bang. Lasting for over 400 years (the first to last for more than a century), the Han dynasty is regarded as one of the golden ages of Chinese history. The Han dynasty was interrupted by the reign of the usurper Wang Mang, who declared the Xin dynasty (AD 9–23); on this basis, the Han dynasty is generally divided into the Western Han (206 BC – AD 9 and AD 23–25) and the Eastern Han (AD 25–220). The rulers of the Shu Han, one of the three successor states to the Han dynasty during the Three Kingdoms period, were descended from the Han imperial family, and considered themselves a continuation of the Han dynasty; they are included below.

Han Dynasty, Xin Dynasty and Shu Han

Liu Taigong 劉太公 d. 197 BC
2	3	4
Liu Xi 劉喜 d. 193 BC; Prince Qing of Dai 代頃王	Liu Bang 劉邦; 256–195 BC; Gaozu 高祖; 206–195 BC	Liu Jiao 劉交 d. 178 BC; Prince Yuan of Chu 楚元王
1	1	2	4	5	6	9
Liu Pi 劉濞; 216–154 BC; Prince of Wu 吳王	Liu Fei 劉肥 d. 189 BC; Prince Daohui of Qi 齊悼惠王	Liu Ying 劉盈; 210–188 BC; Huidi 惠帝; 195–188 BC	Liu Ruyi 劉如意; 208–194 BC; Prince Yin of Zhao 趙隱王	Liu Heng 劉恆; 202–157 BC; Wendi 文帝; 180–157 BC	Liu You 劉友 d. 181 BC; Prince Ji of Zhao 趙幽王	Princess; Luyuan d.187 BC	Liu Yingke 劉郢客 d. 174 BC; Prince Yi of Chu 楚夷王
3	1	2	1	2
Liu Zhang 劉章 d. 177 BC; Prince Jing of Chengyang 城陽景王	Liu Gong 劉恭; Qianshao 前少; 188–184 BC	Liu Hong 劉弘; Houshao 後少; 184–180 BC	Liu Qi 劉啟; 188–141 BC; Jingdi 景帝; 157–141 BC	Liu Wu 劉武 c.184–144 BC; Prince Xiao of Liang	Liu Sui 劉遂 d. 154 BC; Prince of Zhao 趙王	Liu Wu 劉戊 d. 154 BC; Prince of Chu 楚王
5	6	9	10
Liu Xi 劉喜; Prince Gong of Chengyang 城阳恭王	Liu Fei 劉非; 169–128 BC; Prince Yi of Jiangdu 江都易王	Liu Fa 劉發 d. 127 BC; Prince Ding of Changsha 长沙定王	Liu Sheng 劉勝 d. 113 BC; Prince Jing of Zhongshan 中山靖王	Liu Che 劉徹; 157–87 BC; Wudi 武帝; 141–87 BC	Princess; Pingyang 平陽公主
13	1	5	6
Liu Yan 劉延; Prince Qing of Chengyang 城阳顷王	Liu Mai 劉買; Marquess Jie of Chongling 舂陵节侯	Liu Ju 劉據; 128–91 BC; Crown Prince Li 戾太子	Liu Bo 劉髆 d. 86 BC; Prince Ai of Changyi 昌邑哀王	Liu Fuling 劉弗陵; 94–74 BC; Zhaodi 昭帝; 87–74 BC
1	2	1	1
Liu Yi 劉义; Prince Jing of Chengyang 城阳敬王	Liu Xiongqu 劉熊渠; Marquess Dai of Chongling 舂陵戴侯	Liu Wai 劉外; Govnr. of Yulin Comm. 郁林太守	Liu Jin 劉進; 113–91 BC; Emperor's father Dao 悼皇考	Liu He 劉賀; ~92–59 BC; Pr. of Changyi 昌邑王; 74 BC
Liu Wu 劉武; Prince Hui of Chengyang 城阳惠王	Liu Li 劉利; Govnr. of Cangwu Comm. 苍梧太守	Liu Hui 劉回; Superint. of Julu 巨鹿都尉	Wang Jin 王禁	Liu Xun 劉詢; 91–49 BC; Xuandi 宣帝; 74–49 BC
1	3
Liu Shun 劉顺; Prince Huang of Chengyang 城阳荒王	Liu Zizhang 劉子張	Liu Qin 劉欽 d. AD 3 Magistr. of Nandun county 南顿令	Wang Man 王曼	Wang; Zhengjun 王政君; 71 BC–AD 13	Liu Shi 劉奭; 75–33 BC; Yuandi 元帝; 49–33 BC	Liu Xiao 劉囂 d. 25 BC; Prince Xiao of Chu 楚孝王
WEST^{N} HAN; RESTORATION	EAST^{N} HAN	XIN; DYNASTY	1	2	3
Liu Xian 劉宪; Marquess of Shi 式侯	Liu Xuan 劉玄 d. AD 25; Gengshi 更始; AD 23–25	Liu Xiu 劉秀; 5 BC – AD 57; Guangwu 光武; AD 25–57	45 BC–AD 23; Wang Mang 王莽; AD 9–23	Liu Ao 劉驁; 51–7 BC; Chengdi 成帝; 33–7 BC	Liu Kang 劉康 d. 23 BC; Gongdi 恭帝	Liu Xing 劉興 d. 8 BC; Prince Xiao of Zhongshan 中山孝王	Liu Xun 劉勳; Marquess Yang of Guangqi 广戚炀侯
4	7
Liu Meng 劉萌; Marquess of Shi 式侯	Liu Zhuang 劉莊; 28–AD 75; Mingdi 明帝; AD 57–75	Liu Ying 劉英 d. 71; Prince of Chu	Liu Xin 劉欣; 27–1 BC; Aidi 哀帝; 7–1 BC	Empress; Wang 王皇后; 8 BC – 23 AD	Liu Kan 劉衎; 9 BC – AD 6 Pingdi 平帝; 1 BC – AD 6	Liu Xian 劉顯; Marquess of Guangqi 广戚侯
1
Liu Penzi 劉盆子 b.AD 10; AD 25–27	Liu Da 劉炟; AD 57–88; Zhangdi 章帝; AD 75–88	Liu Ying 劉嬰; AD 5–25; Ruzi 孺子; AD 6–9
1	3	4	5	6
Liu Kang 劉伉 d. 93; Prince Zhen of Qiancheng 千乘贞王	Liu Qing 劉慶; 78–106; Xiaode 孝德	Liu Zhao 劉肇; 79–105; Hedi 和帝; 88–105	Liu Shou 劉壽 d. 120; Prince Hui of Jibei 济北惠王	Liu Kai 劉開 d. 132; Xiaomu 孝穆	skipped generations
2
Liu Chong 劉寵 d. 122; Prince Yi of Le'an 乐安夷王	Liu Hu 劉祜; 94–125; Andi 安帝; 106–125	Liu Long 劉隆; 105–106; Shangdi 殤帝; 105–106	Liu Yi 劉懿 d. 125; Shaodi 少帝; 125	Liu Yi 劉翼; Xiaochong 孝崇	Liu Shu 劉淑; Xiaoyuan 孝元	Liu Xiong 劉雄
1
Liu Hong 劉弘 d. 147; Prince Xiao of Bohai 渤海孝王	Liu Bao 劉保; 115–144; Shundi 順帝; 125–144	Liu Zhi 劉志; 132–168; Huandi 桓帝; 146–168	Liu Chang 劉萇; Xiaoren 孝仁	Liu Hong 劉弘
1	SHU HAN
Liu Zuan 劉纘; 138–146; Zhidi 質帝; 145–146	Liu Bing 劉炳; 143–145; Chongdi 沖帝; 144–145	Liu Hong 劉宏; 156–189; Lingdi 靈帝; 168–189	Liu Bei 劉備; 161–223; Zhaoliedi 昭烈帝; 221–223
1	2	1
Liu Bian 劉辯; 176–189; Shaodi 少帝; 189	Liu Xie 劉協; 181–234; Xiandi 獻帝; 189–220	Liu Shan 劉禪; 207–271; Xiaohuaidi 孝懷帝; 223–263

=== Cao Wei ===
Cao Wei

- - - - - = The dashed line denotes an adoption

Cao Cao 曹操 155–220; Wudi 武帝
Cao Pi 曹丕 187–226; Wendi 文帝; 220–226	Cao Zhang 曹彰 189–223; Prince Wei of Rencheng 任城威王	Cao Yu 曹宇 d.278 Prince of Yan 燕王
Cao Rui 曹叡 205–239; Mingdi 明帝; 226–239	Cao Lin 曹霖 d. 249; Prince Ding of Donghai 東海定王	Cao Kai 曹楷; Prince of Jinan 济南王	Cao Huan 曹奐 246–303; Yuandi 元帝; 260–265
Cao Mao 曹髦 241–260; Duke of Gaogui; District 高貴鄉公; 254–260	Cao Fang 曹芳 232–274; Shaodi 少帝; 239–254

=== Eastern Wu ===
Eastern Wu

Sun Zhong 孫鍾
Sun Jian 孫堅 c. 155–191	Sun Jing 孫靜
175–200; Sun Ce 孫策; Marquis of Wu; 197–200	182–252; Sun Quan 孫權; 229–252; Emperor Da 大帝	Sun Gao 孫暠
Sun Deng 孫登; 209–241	Sun He 孫和; 223–253	235–264; Sun Xiu 孫休; 258–264; Emperor Jing 景帝	243–260; Sun Liang 孫亮; 252–258; Prince of Kuaiji 會稽王	Sun Chuo 孫綽	Sun Gong 孫恭
242–284; Sun Hao 孫皓; 264–280	Sun Chen 孫綝; 231–258	Sun Jun 孫峻; 219–256

== Jin dynasty and Chu ==
The following is a family tree for the Jin dynasty, which ruled a unified China during the Western Jin Dynasty (AD 265–316). Although greatly weakened by the War of the Eight Princes during the reign of the developmentally disabled Emperor Hui, when members of the clan fought among themselves for imperial control, and forced Eastwards after the conquest of their capital in AD 316, the dynasty nonetheless continued in the form of the Eastern Jin Dynasty until AD 420.

Jin Dynasty and Chu

- – Western Jin dynasty emperor;
- – Eastern Jin dynasty emperor;
- – The Eight Princes
- - - - - - = The dashed line denotes an adoption

Sima Ang 司馬昂 d. 205 BC; Yinwang 殷王; 206–205 BC
skipped generations
Sima Jun 司馬儁; 113–197
Sima Fang 司馬防; 149–219
Sima Lang 司馬朗; 171–217	Sima Fu 司馬孚; 180–272	Sima Yi 司馬懿; 179–251; Xuandi 宣帝	Sima Kui 司馬馗
Sima Wang 司馬望 205–271; Prince of Langyang	Sima Gui 司馬瑰 d. 274; Prince of Taiyuan	Sima Zhao 司馬昭 211–265; Wendi 文帝	Sima Liang 司馬亮 d. 291; Prince of Runan	Sima Lun 司馬倫 r.301?; d. 301; Prince of Zhao	Sima Shi 司馬師; 208–255; Jingdi 景帝	Sima Zhou 司馬伷; 227–283	Sima Tai 司馬泰 d. 299; Prince of Gaomi
Sima Yong 司馬顒 d. 306; Prince of Hejian	Sima Yan 司馬炎; 236–290; Wudi 武帝; 265–290	Sima You 司馬攸; 248–283; Prince of Qi	Sima Jin 司馬覲 256–290; Prince of Langye	Sima Yue 司馬越 d. 311; Prince of Donghai	Sima Mo 司馬模 d. 311; Prince of Nanyang
Sima Zhong 司馬衷; 259–307; Huidi 惠帝; 290–307	Sima Wei 司馬瑋; 271–291; Prince of Chu	Sima Ai 司馬乂; 277–304; Prince of Changsha	Sima Jiong 司馬冏 d. 302; Prince of Qi	Sima Rui 司馬睿; 276–323; Yuandi 元帝; 317–323	Sima Bao 司馬保; 294–320; Yuanwang 元王; 319–320
Sima Yu 司馬遹; 278–300; Crown Prince	Sima Ying 司馬穎 279–306; Prince of Chengdu	Sima Yan 司馬晏283–313; Prince of Wu	Sima Chi 司馬熾; 284–313; Huaidi 懷帝; 307–311
Huan Yi 桓彝; 276–328	Sima Ye 司馬業; 300–318; Mindi 愍帝; 313–316	Sima Shao 司馬紹; 299–326; Mingdi 明帝; 323–326	Sima Yu 司馬昱; 320–372; Jianwen 簡文; 371–372
Huan Chong 桓沖 328–384; Prince of Xuancheng	Huan Wen 桓溫 312–373; Xuanwu 宣武	Sima Xingnan 司馬興男	Sima Yan 司馬衍; 321–342; Chengdi 成帝; 326–342	Sima Yue 司馬岳; 322–344; Kangdi 康帝; 342–344	Sima Yao 司馬曜; 362–396; Xiaowu 孝武; 372–396	Sima Daozi 司馬道子; 364–403; Prince of Kuaiji
Huan Xuan 桓玄 369–404; Wudao 武悼 of Chu; 403–404	Sima Pi 司馬丕; 341–365; Aidi 哀帝; 361–365	Sima Yi 司馬奕; 342–386; Feidi 廢帝; 365–371	Sima Dan 司馬聃; 343–361; Mudi 穆帝; 344–361	Sima Dezong; 382–419; Andi 安帝; 396–403; 404–419	Sima Dewen 司馬德文 386–421; Gongdi 恭帝; 419–420	Sima Yuanxian 司馬元顯; 382–402; Heir Apparent; Zhongof Kuaiji
Emperor Shao of Liu Song (劉)宋少帝; 406–422–424	Sima Maoying 司馬茂英; 393?–439

== Sixteen Kingdoms ==
=== Cheng Han ===
Cheng Han

Li Mu
Li Te 李特 (r. 303)	Li Liu 李流; 248–303; r. 303	Li Xiang 李骧
Li Dang 李蕩 (?–303)	Li Xiong 李雄 (274–334); Wu 武 r. 304–334	Empress Ren 任皇后	Empress Yan 閻皇后	Li Shou 李壽 (300–343); Zhaowen 昭文 r. 338–343
Li Ban 李班 (288–334); Aidi 哀皇帝 r. 334	Li Qi 李期 (314–d. 338); Yōu 幽 r. 334–338	Empress Yan 閻皇后	Li Yue (?–338)	Empress Li 李皇后	Li Shi r. 343–347; d. 361

=== (Han) Former Zhao ===
(Han) Former Zhao emperors family tree

Huzheng 呼徵 (d. 179; r. 178–179)
Qiangqui 羌渠 (d. 188; r. 179–188)	Liu Liang 刘亮
Yufuluo 於夫羅; Chizhishizhuhou 持至尸逐侯 (150–196; r. 188–195)	Huchuquan 呼廚泉 (d.? r. 195–216)	Liu Guang 刘广
HAN	?
Liu Bao 劉豹 (d.?; r. 216–260)	Liu Qubei 劉去卑 d. 272; r. 260–272	Liu Fang 刘防
Liu Yannian 刘延年	Liu Yuan 劉淵 (d. 310); Guangwen 光文 (r. 304–310)	Liu Xiong 刘雄	See Xia	Liu Lu 劉綠
(FORMER) ZHAO
Liu He 劉和 (d./r. 310)	Liu Gong 刘恭 d. 310	Liu Cong 劉聰 (d. 318); Zhāowǔdi 昭武皇帝 (r. 310–318)	Liu Yu 劉裕 (d. 310)	Liu Long 刘隆 d. 310	Liu Yi 刘乂 (d. 317)	Liu Yao 劉曜 (d. 329; r. 318–329)
Liu Can 劉粲 (d. 318); Yin 隱帝 (r. 318)	Liu Yin 劉胤 (d./r. 329)	Liu Xi 劉熙 (d./r. 329)
Liu Yuangong 劉元公 (d. 318)

=== Yan states and Tuyuhun ===
Legend about affiliations:

- – Former Yan
- – Later Yan
- – Northern Yan
- – Southern Yan
- – Western Yan
- – Tuyuhun

Murong clan family tree

Murong 慕容 ?–156–181
skipped generations
Murong Mohuba 慕容莫护跋 r. ?–246
Murong Muyan 慕容木延 r. 246–271
Murong Shegui 慕容涉归 r. 271–283	Murong Shan 慕容刪 r. 283–285
Murong; Tuyuhun 慕容吐谷浑; Henan King; 284–317	Murong Yun 慕容运	Murong Hui 慕容廆; Duke Xiang of Liaodong; 269–307–333
Murong Tuyan 慕容吐延; Henan King; 317–329	□	Murong Huang 慕容皝; Wenming of Former Yan; 297–333–348	Murong Ping 慕容評; Regent of Murong Wei ?-?
Murong Yeyan 慕容葉延; Tuyuhun King; 329–351	Murong Yong of Western Yan 慕容永(d. 394) (r. 386–394)	Murong Jun 慕容儁; Jingzhao of Former Yan; 319–348–360	Murong Ke 慕容恪; Prince Huan of Taiyuan (?–367)	Murong Huan 慕容桓 (?–373); Prince of Yidu	Murong Na 慕容纳 (?–385); Prince of Beihai	Murong Chui 慕容垂; Wucheng of (Later) Yan; 326–384–396	Murong De 慕容德; Xianwu of (Southern) Yan; 336–398–405
Murong Suixi 慕容碎奚; Tuyuhun King; 351–371	Murong Wei; You of Former Yan; 350–360– 370–385	Murong Hong of Western Yan 慕容泓 (d. 384)	Murong Chong 慕容冲; Wei of Western Yan; 359–384–386	Murong Yi; Prince of (Western) Yan 慕容顗 (d./r. 386)	Murong Chao of Southern Yan 慕容超; 385–405–410	Murong Bao 慕容宝; Huimin of (Later) Yan; 355–396–398	Murong Nong 慕容農; Prince Huanlie of Liaoxi d. 398	Murong Long 慕容隆; Prince Kang of Gaoyang d. 397	Murong Lin 慕容麟; Prince of Zhao r. 397; d. 398	Murong Xi 慕容熙; Zhaowen of (Later) Yan; 385–401–407
Feng An 馮安
Murong Shilian 慕容視連 ?–371–390	Murong Zhong (Prince) of (Western) Yan 慕容忠(d./r. 386)	Murong Yao (Prince) of (Western) Yan 慕容瑶(d./r. 386)	Murong Sheng 慕容盛; Zhaowu of (Later) Yan; 373–398–401	Murong Hui 慕容會; Prince of Qinghe; 373–397	Gao/Murong Yun 高/慕容云 (d. 409); Huiyi of (Later)/ (Northern)Yan r. 407–409	Feng Ba 馮跋 (d. 430); Wencheng of Northern Yan r. 409–430	Feng Hong 馮弘 d. 438; Zhaocheng of Northern; Yan r. 430–436
Murong Shipi 慕容視羆; 368–390–400	Murong Wugeti 慕容烏紇褆 ?–400–405
Murong; Shuluogan 慕容樹洛干; 392–405–417	Murong Achai 慕容阿柴 ?–417–424	Murong Mugui 慕容慕璝 ?–424–436	Murong Muliyan 慕容慕利延 ?–436–452
Murong Shiyin 慕容拾寅 ?–452–481
Murong Duyihou 慕容度易侯 ?–481–490
Murong; Fulianchou 慕容伏連籌 ?–490–540
Murong; Heluozhen 呵羅真 ?–529–530	Murong Kualu 慕容夸呂 ?–540–591
Murong Fofu 佛輔 ?–530–534	Murong Shifu 慕容世伏 ?–591–597	Murong Fuyun 慕容伏允 ?–597–635
Murong; Ketazhen 可沓振 ?–534–540	Murong Shun 慕容顺; 604–635
Murong; Nuohebo 慕容諾曷鉢 ?–635–672–688

=== Later Zhao ===
Later Zhao monarchs family tree

Adoption
Shi Xie 石邪	Shi Beixie 石㔨邪
Shi Zhouhezhu 石周曷朱	Shi Koumi 寇覓
Shi Le 石勒 (274–333); Ming 明 r. 319–333	Shi Hu 石虎 (295–349); Wu 武 (r. 334–349)	Ran Long 冉隆
Shi Hong 石弘; 314–335; r. 333–334	Shi Zun 石遵 (d./r. 349)	Shi Jian 石鑒 d. 350; r. 349–350	Shi Zhi 石祗 d. 351; r. 350–351	Shi Shi 石世; 339–349; r.349	Ran Zhan 冉瞻 (299?–328)
Ran Min 冉閔 (d. 352) of Ran Wei (冉魏) state r. 350–352
Ran Zhi 冉智 (d. 354) of Ran Wei (冉魏) state r. 352

=== Former Liang ===
Former Liang rulers family tree

Zhang Gui 張軌 (255–314); Wǔwáng 武王 (r. 301–314)
Zhang Shi 張寔 (d. 320); Míngwáng 明王 / Zhāowáng 昭王 (r. 314–320)	Zhang Mao 張茂 (276–324); Chenglie 成烈 / Cheng 成 r. (320–)323–324
Zhang Jun 張駿 (307–346); Wen 文 / Zhongcheng 忠成 r. 324–346
Zhang Zuo 張祚 (d. 355); Wei 威 (r. 353–355)	Zhang Chonghua 張重華 (327–353); Jinglie 敬烈 / Huan 桓 r. 346–353	Zhang Tianxi 張天錫 (346–406); Dao 悼 (r. 363–376)
Zhang Yaoling 張曜靈 (344–355); Ai 哀 (r. 353–355)	Zhang Xuanjing 張玄靖 (350–363); Jingdao 敬悼 / Chong 沖 r. 355–363	Zhang Dayu 張大豫 d. 387; r. 386–387

=== Later Liang ===
Later Liang

Lü Polou 呂婆樓
Lü Guang 呂光 (338–400); Yiwu 懿武 (r. 386–400)	Lu Bao 吕宝 (d. 392)
Lu Zuan 呂纂 (d. 401); Ling 靈 r. (397–)399–401	Lü Shao 呂紹 (d. 399); Yin 隱 (r. 399)	Lü Long 吕隆 (d. 416) r. 401–403(–416)

=== Northern Liang ===
Northern Liang rulers family tree

	Juqu Mengxun 沮渠蒙逊 368–433; Wuxuan 武宣 r. 401–433
Juqu Mujian 沮渠牧犍 bef. 420–d. 447; Ai 哀 r. 433–439	Juqu Wuhui 沮渠無諱 d. 444; r. 442–444	Juqu Anzhou 沮渠安周 d. 460; r. 444–460

=== Western Liang ===
Western Liang rulers family tree

	Li Gao (李暠) 351–417; Prince Wǔzhāo (武昭王) r. 400–417
Li Xin 李歆 d. 420; r. 417–420	Li Xun 李恂 d. 421; r. 420–421	Li Jingshou 李敬受 d. 437?	Juqu Mujian 沮渠牧犍 of Northern Liang

=== Former Qin ===
Former Qin

Fu Huaigui 苻懷歸
Fu Hong (苻洪) 285–350; Huiwu
Fu Jian (苻健) 317–355; Jingming 景明 (r. 352–355)	Fu Xiong	Fu Chang
Fu Sheng (苻生) 335–357; Li 厲 (r. 355–357)	Fu Jian 苻堅 (337–385); Xuanzhao 宣昭 (r. 357–385)	Fu Deng 苻登 (343–394); Gao 高 (r. 386–394)
Fu Pi 苻丕 (d. 386); Aiping 哀平 (r. 385–386)	Fu Chong (苻崇) d. 394; r. 394

=== Later Qin ===
Later Qin rulers family tree

Yao Kehui 姚柯回
Yao Yizhong (280–352)
Yao Xiang 姚襄 (331–357)	Yao Chang 姚苌 (330–393); Wuzhao 武昭 (r. 384–(386–)394)
Yao Xing 姚兴 (366–416); Wenhuan 文桓 (r. 394–416)
Houzhu (Yao Hong) 侯主(姚泓); 388–417; r. 416–417

=== Western Qin ===
Western Qin

Qifu Sifan 乞伏司繁 (d. 376)
Qifu Guoren 乞伏国仁 (d. 388); Xuanlie 宣烈 r. 385–388	Qifu Qiangui 乞伏乾归 (d. 412); Wuyuan 武元 r. 388–400; 409–412
Qifu Gongfu 乞伏公府	Qifu Achai 乞伏阿柴	Qifu Chipan 乞伏熾磐 (d. 428); Wenzhao 文昭 r. 412–428
Qifu Yuanji 乞伏元基	Qifu Mumo 乞伏暮末 d. 431; r. 428–431
Qifu Wanzai 乞伏万载

=== Southern Liang ===
Southern Liang

Tufa Sifujian
Tufa Wugu 禿髮烏孤 d. 399; Wu 武 r. 397–399	Tufa Lilugu 禿髮利鹿孤 d. 402; Kang 康 r. 399–402	Tufa Rutan 禿髮傉檀 365–415; Jing 景 r. 402–414	Princess Zhejue
Qifu Chipan; Wenzhao of (Western) Qin r. 412–428	Princess Tufa d. 423	Yuan He 源賀 b. 403–d. 479

=== Xia ===
Xia

Qubei 去卑 d. ?; r. 216–?
Liu Meng 劉猛 d. 272	Liu; Gaoshengyuan 劉誥升爰 d. 309; r. ?–309
Liu Fulun 劉副崙	Liu Hu 劉虎 d. 341; r. 309–341
Liu Wuheng 劉務恆 d. 356; r. 341–356	Liu Eloutou 劉閼陋頭 r. 356–358
Liu Xiwuqi 劉悉勿祈 r. 358–359	Liu Weichen 劉衛辰 d. 391; r. 359–391
You Dedai 右地代	□	Li Qiti 力俟提	Ali Luoyin 阿利羅引	Zhi Lidi 直力鞮	Wei Fa 韋伐	Helian Bobo 赫連勃勃 b. 381– d. 425; Wulie 武烈 r. 407–425	Ruo Men 若門	Chi Yijian 叱以鞬	Yi Dou 乙鬥	Wen Chen 文陳	□
Luo Tí 羅提	Helian; Zhuxing 赫連助興	Helian; Weiyidai 赫連謂以代	Helian; Duluogu 赫連度洛孤	Helian; Shegan 赫連社乾	Helian; Wushiba 赫連烏視拔	Helian; Tugu 赫連禿骨	Helian; An 赫連安	Suruo; Dougen 宿若豆根	Yi Sheng 乙升
Helian; Gui 赫連璝 d. 424	Helian; Yan 赫連延	Helian Chang 赫連昌 d. 434; r. 425–428	Helian Lun 赫連倫 d. 424	Helian Ding 赫連定 d. 432; r. 428–431	Helian; Man 赫連滿	Empress Helian d. 453; Empress Taiwu 太武皇后 (432–452)	Su Dagan 宿沓乾
daughter wife of Luo Ti 羅提	Helian; Douwuyu 赫連豆勿於	Su Shí 宿石
□	Su Ni 宿倪
Helian; Ziyue 赫連子悅
Helian; Zhungzhang 赫連仲章

== Other states contemporaneous with Sixteen Kingdoms ==
=== Dai ===
Tuoba clan of Dai state family tree

Tuoba Liwei 拓跋力微; 174–219–277
Tuoba; Shamohan 拓跋沙漠汗 d. 277	Tuoba Xilu 拓跋悉鹿 r. 277–286; d. 268	Tuoba Chuo 拓跋綽 r. 286–293; d. 293	Tuoba Luguan 拓跋祿官 r. 294–307; d. 307
Tuoba Fu 拓跋弗 r. 293–294; d. 294	Tuoba Yituo 拓跋猗㐌 r. 295–305; d. 305	Tuoba Yilu 拓跋猗盧 r. 295–316; d. 316
Tuoba Yulü 拓跋鬱律 r. 316–321; d. 321	Tuoba Heru 拓跋賀傉 r. 321–325; d. 325	Tuoba Pugen 拓跋普根 r. (305–)316; d. 316	Tuoba Hena 拓跋紇那 r. 325–329; 335–337	Tuoba Liuxiu 拓跋六修	Tuoba Biyan 拓跋比延
Tuoba Yihuai 拓跋翳槐 r. 329–335; 337–338; d. 338	Tuoba Shiyiqian 拓跋什翼犍; 320–338–376	son r./d. 316
???
Tuoba Shi 拓跋寔 d. 371
Tuoba Gui 拓跋珪; 371–409; Daowu of Northern Wei; 386–409
Tuoba clan family tree of Northern Wei dynasty

=== Zhai Wei ===
Zhai Wei family tree

□
Zhai Bin 翟斌 r. 383–384	Zhai Tan 翟檀 d. 384	Zhai Min 翟敏 d. 384	□	□
Zhai Liao 翟遼; Jianguang Tian Wang 建光天王 r. 386–391	Zhai Zhen 翟真 r. 384–385	Zhai Cheng 翟成 r. 385
Zhai Zhao 翟釗; Dingding Tian Wang 定鼎天王 r. 391–392– d. 393
