= Lady Qi (Tuoba Dai) =

Lady Qi (祁夫人, fl. 316–324), also known as Lady Wei (惟氏), was the wife of Tuoba Yituo and a regent of Dai in the Sixteen Kingdoms between 321 and 324, during the minority of her son. As the rulers of Dai were posthumously honoured as emperors during the Northern Wei, she is also referred to as Empress Dowager Qi (皇后祁) or Empress Dowager Wei (皇后惟) in some historical records.

After overthrowing Tuoba Yulü in a bloody coup, Lady Qi ruled Dai for roughly four years between 321 and 324 behind her son, Tuoba Heru. During her brief rule over the state, Dai was described as a 'queendom' (女國) by the people of Later Zhao. Following Tuoba Gui's claim of the imperial title in 399, Lady Qi was posthumously honoured as Empress Huan (桓皇后).

== Background ==
Lady Qi was the wife of Tuoba Yituo, the chieftain of the central Tuoba branch located around northern Shanxi between 295 and 305. The Book of Wei records that her family name was 'Qi' (祁) but in the History of the Northern Dynasties and Zizhi Tongjian, her family name was recorded as 'Wei' (惟) instead. She was described as a fierce and jealous woman. She and Tuoba Yituo had three children: Tuoba Pugen, Tuoba Heru and Tuoba Hena. Yituo died in 305 and was succeeded by the eldest son, Pugen. After the chieftain of the eastern Tuoba branch, Tuoba Luguan, died in 307, the chieftain of the western Tuoba branch, Lady Qi's brother-in-law, Tuoba Yilu, re-unified the Tuoba tribes and later established their state of Dai in 310.

== As regent ==
Yilu was assassinated by his son, Tuoba Liuxiu (拓跋六修) in 316. In response Pugen raised his troops against Liuxiu and killed him that same year. Pugen declared himself the new Prince of Dai but died of an illness just a few months after his ascension. Pugen's son, who was never given a name, was just born at the time of his father's death, so Lady Qi helped install him as the new prince. However, he too would die by the end of the year, and with no suitable brother or son to take the throne, Pugen's cousin, Tuoba Yulü, was acclaimed the new ruler.

Tuoba Yulü was a very popular figure among his subject throughout his reign. Because of this, Lady Qi feared that Yulü's influence may bring trouble to her two sons. As a result, near the end of 321, Lady Qi assassinated Yulü and executed dozens of the chiefs living in Dai. However, she was unable to kill Yulü's son, Tuoba Shiyiqian, who managed to flee with his mother, Lady Wang (王氏).

Lady Qi installed her middle son, Tuoba Heru, as the new Prince of Dai. However, he was still young at the time, so Lady Qi acted as his regent. She became the de facto ruler of Dai, controlling the court and handling state affairs. Shortly after the coup, Lady Qi sent envoys to the ruler of Later Zhao, Shi Le, to establish peace between their two states (Yulü had previously broken ties with Shi Le after Shi Le declared independence from Han-Zhao in 319). Shi Le accepted Lady Qi's envoys, and the people of Zhao called them "Envoys of the Queendom" (女國使).

Lady Qi ruled Dai between 321 and 324. Very little is recorded about her rule. In early 324, her court received envoys bringing tribute from the ruler of Former Liang, Zhang Jun, after he succeeded his uncle, Zhang Mao. Later that year, Tuoba Heru first began to personally rule over the state. It is not known if this was a result of Heru reaching adulthood or if Lady Qi had died that year. Lady Qi's youngest son, Tuoba Hena, would succeed his brother in 325 after he died childless. After Tuoba Gui declared himself Emperor of Northern Wei in 399, he posthumously honoured the rulers of Dai as emperors. Tuoba Yituo was named Emperor Huan (桓皇帝), while Lady Qi was named Empress Huan.
