= Prince of Dai =

Ancient and medieval Chinese title

- Chinese: 代王
- Literal meaning: King of Dai; Prince of Dai
Transcriptions
Standard Mandarin
- Hanyu Pinyin: Dàiwáng
- Wade–Giles: Tai Wang

Prince or King of Dai was an ancient and medieval Chinese title.

King of Dai is sometimes used to describe the heads of the Baidi state of Dai north of the Zhou Kingdom that was conquered by the Zhao clan of Jin. It was used as the title for the Zhao successor state headed by Zhao Jia, and for one of the Eighteen Kingdoms established by Xiang Yu after the fall of Qin.

The title King or Prince of Dai was subsequently used as an appanage of imperial Chinese dynasties, in reference to the Commandery of Dai that existed from the state of Zhao until the Sui. It was also sometimes used to describe rebellious or independent kingdoms in the same area.

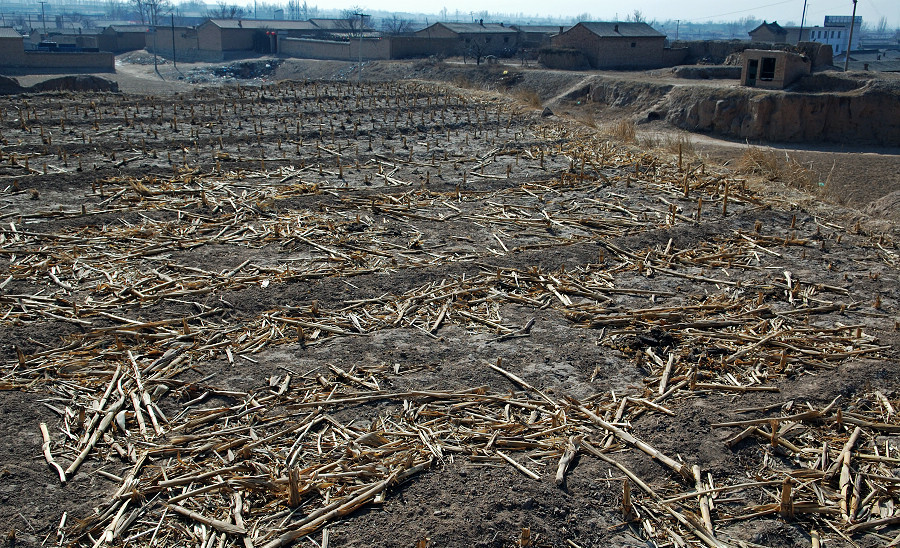
The ruins of ancient Dai in Yu County, Hebei.

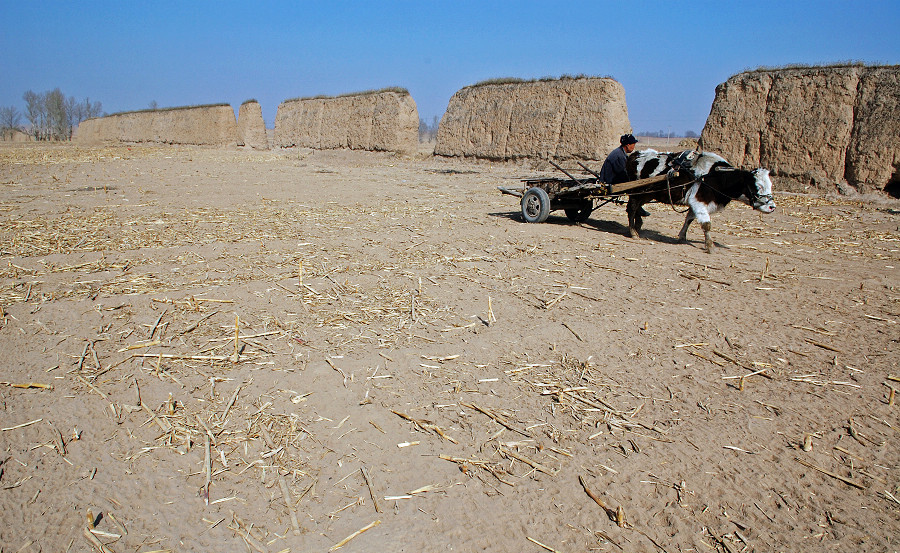
The ruins of ancient Dai in Yu County, Hebei.

== Title holders ==
=== Warring States ===
- Zhao Jia

=== Eighteen Kingdoms ===
- Zhao Xie
- Chen Yu

=== Han dynasty ===
- Liu Xi or Zhong (r. 201–200 BC), elder brother of Liu Bang (posthumously "Emperor Gaozu"), demoted for cowardice
- Liu Ruyi (200–198 BC), son of Liu Bang by the concubine Qi, translated to Zhao
- Chen Xi (197–194 BC), rebel
- Liu Heng (196–180 BC), son of Liu Bang by the consort Bo, promoted to emperor (posthumously "Emperor Wen")
- Liu Wu, (178 BC – 176 BC) second son of Liu Heng
- Liu Can (176 BC – 162 BC), third son of Liu Heng
- Liu Deng (162 BC – 133 BC), son of Liu Can, grandson of Emperor Wen of Han
- Liu Lang (133 BC – 114 BC), great grandson of Emperor Wen of Han, last Prince of Dai in Han dynasty

=== Sixteen Kingdoms ===
- Tuoba Yilu (died 316), chieftain of the Tuoba tribe appointed Duke of Dai, then Prince of Dai by Western Jin
- Tuoba Pugen (died 316), son of Tuoba Yilu
- Tuoba Yulü (died 321), killed in a coup d'état by Tuoba Heru
- Tuoba Heru (died 325), succeed after coup, son of Tuoba Yituo
- Tuoba Yihuai (died 338, 337–338), son of Tuoba Yulü
- Tuoba Shiyiqian (320–376), younger brother of Tuoba Yihuai, last Prince of Dai, and grandfather of Emperor Daowu of Northern Wei

== See also ==
- Dai (disambiguation)
- Prince of Wu
