= 338 =

338 in various calendars
- Gregorian calendar: 338; CCCXXXVIII
- Ab urbe condita: 1091
- Assyrian calendar: 5088
- Balinese saka calendar: 259–260
- Bengali calendar: −256 – −255
- Berber calendar: 1288
- Buddhist calendar: 882
- Burmese calendar: −300
- Byzantine calendar: 5846–5847
- Chinese calendar: 丁酉年 (Fire Rooster); 3035 or 2828 — to — 戊戌年 (Earth Dog); 3036 or 2829
- Coptic calendar: 54–55
- Discordian calendar: 1504
- Ethiopian calendar: 330–331
- Hebrew calendar: 4098–4099
- Hindu calendars
- Vikram Samvat: 394–395
- Shaka Samvat: 259–260
- Kali Yuga: 3438–3439
- Holocene calendar: 10338
- Iranian calendar: 284 BP – 283 BP
- Islamic calendar: 293 BH – 292 BH
- Javanese calendar: 219–220
- Julian calendar: 338; CCCXXXVIII
- Korean calendar: 2671
- Minguo calendar: 1574 before ROC 民前1574年
- Nanakshahi calendar: −1130
- Seleucid era: 649/650 AG
- Thai solar calendar: 880–881
- Tibetan calendar: མེ་མོ་བྱ་ལོ་ (female Fire-Bird); 464 or 83 or −689 — to — ས་ཕོ་ཁྱི་ལོ་ (male Earth-Dog); 465 or 84 or −688

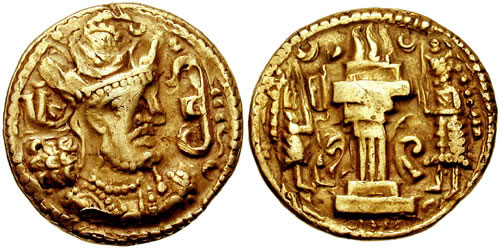
King Shapur II the Great (r. 309–379)

Year 338 (CCCXXXVIII) was a common year starting on Sunday of the Julian calendar. At the time, it was known as the Year of the Consulship of Ursus and Polemius (or, less frequently, year 1091 Ab urbe condita). The denomination 338 for this year has been used since the early medieval period, when the Anno Domini calendar era became the prevalent method in Europe for naming years.

== Events ==
=== By place ===
==== Roman Empire ====
- The Romans, allied with the Goths, arrive in the north of the Roman Empire to protect the Danube frontier.
- Emperor Constantius II intervenes against the Persians in Armenia.

==== Persia ====
- Shapur II, king of the Persian Empire, begins a widespread persecution of Christians. He orders forcible conversions to the state religion, Zoroastrianism, lest the Christians disrupt his realm while he is away fighting the Romans in Armenia and Mesopotamia.

==== Asia ====
- Tuoba Yihuai, ruler of the Tuoba Dai clan, dies and is succeeded by his brother Tuoba Shiyiqian.

=== By topic ===
==== Art ====
- The Church of Santa Costanza, Rome, starts to be built (approximate date).

==== Religion ====
- Eusebius of Nicomedia becomes Patriarch of Constantinople, after Paul I is banished.
- Non-Christians are persecuted by the Roman Empire as pagans.

== Births ==
- Isaac the Great, Armenian catholicos (d. 439)

== Deaths ==
- Flavius Ablabius, Roman consul and politician
- Li Qi, Chinese emperor of Cheng Han (b. 314)
- Tuoba Yihuai, prince of the Tuoba Dai clan
