= 321 =

321 in various calendars
- Gregorian calendar: 321; CCCXXI
- Ab urbe condita: 1074
- Assyrian calendar: 5071
- Balinese saka calendar: 242–243
- Bengali calendar: −273 – −272
- Berber calendar: 1271
- Buddhist calendar: 865
- Burmese calendar: −317
- Byzantine calendar: 5829–5830
- Chinese calendar: 庚辰年 (Metal Dragon); 3018 or 2811 — to — 辛巳年 (Metal Snake); 3019 or 2812
- Coptic calendar: 37–38
- Discordian calendar: 1487
- Ethiopian calendar: 313–314
- Hebrew calendar: 4081–4082
- Hindu calendars
- Vikram Samvat: 377–378
- Shaka Samvat: 242–243
- Kali Yuga: 3421–3422
- Holocene calendar: 10321
- Iranian calendar: 301 BP – 300 BP
- Islamic calendar: 310 BH – 309 BH
- Javanese calendar: 202–203
- Julian calendar: 321; CCCXXI
- Korean calendar: 2654
- Minguo calendar: 1591 before ROC 民前1591年
- Nanakshahi calendar: −1147
- Seleucid era: 632/633 AG
- Thai solar calendar: 863–864
- Tibetan calendar: ལྕགས་ཕོ་འབྲུག་ལོ་ (male Iron-Dragon); 447 or 66 or −706 — to — ལྕགས་མོ་སྦྲུལ་ལོ་ (female Iron-Snake); 448 or 67 or −705

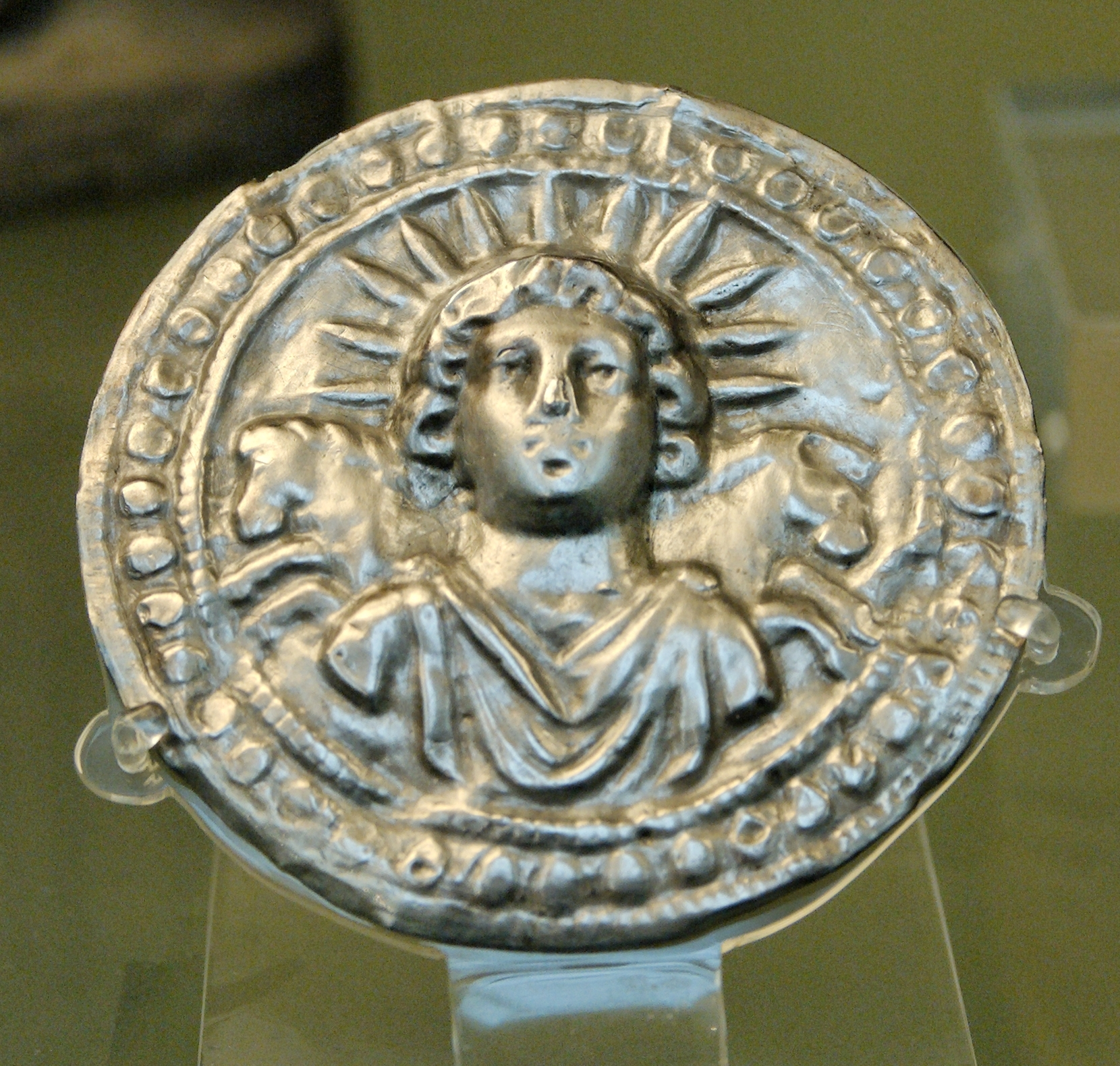
Roman sun god Sol Invictus

Year 321 (CCCXXI) was a common year starting on Sunday of the Julian calendar. In the Roman Empire, it was known as the Year of the Consulship of Crispus and Constantinus (or, less frequently, year 1074 Ab urbe condita). The denomination 321 for this year has been used since the early medieval period, when the Anno Domini calendar era became the prevalent method in Europe for naming years.

== Events ==
=== By topic ===
==== Roman Empire ====
- Emperor Constantine I expels the Goths from the Danube frontier and repairs Trajan's Bridge. He leads an expedition into the old province Dacia (modern Romania) and makes peace with the barbarians.
- March 7 - Constantine I signs legislation directing urban residents to refrain from work, and businesses to be closed, on the "venerable day of the Sun", which is now referred to as the Constantine Sunday Law of 321. It is from here that much of Western Culture celebrates Sunday as the official weekend. An exception is made for agriculture.

==== Asia ====
- Tuoba Heru launches a coup d'état against his cousin Tuoba Yulü and becomes the new Prince of Dai.

=== By topic ===
==== Art and Science ====
- Calcidius translates Plato into Latin.

==== Food and Drink ====
- Constantine I assigns convicts to grind Rome's flour, in a move to hold back the rising price of food in an empire whose population has shrunk as a result of plague.

==== Religion ====
- The Christian Church is allowed to hold property.
- A synod held in Alexandria condemns Arianism.
- History of the Jews in Germany: Jews in modern-day Germany are documented for the first time, in Colonia Agrippinensium (modern-day Cologne).

== Births ==
- Cheng of Jin (or Shigen), Chinese emperor (d. 342)
- Du Lingyang (or Chenggong), Chinese empress (d. 341)
- Valentinian I ("the Great"), Roman emperor (d. 375)

== Deaths ==
- Tuoba Yulü, Chinese prince of the Tuoba Dai
- Zu Ti (or Shizhi), Chinese general and adviser (b. 266)
