= Tuoba Hena =

Tuoba Hena 拓跋紇那
- Prince of Dai

Prince of Dai
- Reign: 325–329
- Predecessor: Tuoba Heru
- Successor: Tuoba Yihuai
- Reign: 335–337
- Predecessor: Tuoba Yihuai
- Successor: Tuoba Yihuai
Full name
- Family name: Tuòbá (拓跋); Given name: Hénà (紇那)
Regnal name
- Prince of Dai (代王)
Posthumous name
- Emperor Yang (煬皇帝, honored by Northern Wei)
- Dynasty: Dai

Tuoba Hena (Chinese: 拓跋紇那; pinyin: Tuòbá Hénà; fl. 325–337) ruled as prince of the Tuoba Dai from 325 to 329 and again from 335 to 337. He was the youngest son of Tuoba Yituo and brother of his predecessor, Tuoba Heru.

== Life ==
Tuoba Hena was the youngest of three sons of Tuoba Yituo and Lady Qi. Yituo was chieftain of the central Tuoba branch between 295 and 305. Following the re-unification of the Tuoba tribes and establishment of Dai, his eldest brother, Tuoba Pugen, became the Prince of Dai in 316. He died just a few months into his reign and was succeeded by his unnamed newborn. However, his son would also die in 316, so his cousin, Tuoba Yulü was chosen to succeed him. Lady Qi assassinated Yulü in a coup and place his second-oldest brother, Tuoba Heru on the throne in 321. Hena assumed the throne in 325 after his brother died childless.

In 327, the Later Zhao general, Shi Hu attacked Dai. Tuoba Hena led his troops to face him north of the border pass at Gouzhu (句注, northwest of present-day Dai County, Shanxi) but was defeated. To avoid posing as a threat to Zhao, Hena moved the capital to Daning. Shortly after this, Hena demanded the Helan clan (賀蘭部) to handover Tuoba Yihuai, the son of Tuoba Yulü who had been living with them. The chieftain of the Helan and Yihuai's uncle, Helan Aitou (賀蘭藹頭) refused to do so. Hena then led an attack with the Yuwen tribe against the Helan but failed.

In 329, the Helan and many other tribes collectively acclaimed Tuoba Yihuai as the new Prince of Dai. As a result, Tuoba Hena fled to the Yuwen tribe to seek refuge.

In 335, Yihuai had his uncle, Helan Aitou (賀蘭藹頭) executed after he felt that his uncle was not showing him enough respect. Aitou's death stirred up anger among the Dai tribes. Hena took the opportunity to return to Dai, where he was warmly-welcomed by the people who acclaimed him the Prince of Dai. With no support to back him up, Yihuai fled to Later Zhao, where he was granted residence by Shi Hu, who by then was the ruler of Zhao.

Hena's second reign lasted three years. In 337, the Zhao general, Li Mu (李穆), escorted Tuoba Yihuai with 5,000 cavalry to Daning. The tribes once more acclaimed Yihuai as the Prince of Dai, so Hena this time fled to Former Yan in Liaodong, where he was received by the ruling Murong clan.

Emperor Yang of Dai House of Tuoba Died: 338
Chinese royalty
| Preceded by Tuoba Heru | Prince of Dai; 325–329 | Succeeded by Tuoba Yihuai |
| Preceded by Tuoba Heru | Prince of Dai; 335–337 | Succeeded by Tuoba Yihuai |
