= Liu Xi =

Liu Xi or Liuxi may refer to:

== People ==
- Liu Zhong (died 193 BC), also known as Liu Xi, Han dynasty prince, elder brother of Emperor Gaozu
- Liu Xi (Han-Zhao) (died 329), final leader of the state of Han-Zhao (as crown prince)
- Liu Xi (Liao dynasty) (fl. 10th century), official of the Liao dynasty
- Liu Xi (Eastern Han prince) (劉歙; died 34), Eastern Han prince, relative of Emperor Guangwu
- Liu Xi (Eastern Han official) (劉憙), Eastern Han official

== Places ==
- Liuxi Township, Jiangxi (柳溪乡), township in Fengxin County, Jiangxi, China
- Liuxi Township, Qu County (流溪乡), township in Qu County, Sichuan, China
- Liuxi Township, Wangcang County (柳溪乡), township in Wangcang County, Sichuan, China
