= Shengle =

Former capital city in China

Coordinates: 40.465°N 111.767°E

- 盛樂 (Chinese)
- Location within China
- Cultures: Xianbei
- Location: Horinger County, Hohhot, Inner Mongolia, China

Shengle (Chinese: 盛樂; pinyin: Shènglè) was the capital of the Xianbei-led Dai state and the first capital of the Northern Wei dynasty in the 4th century. The ruins of ancient Shengle is located at present-day Xiyaozi and Tuchengzi village, in the town of Shengle, in Horinger County, 40 kilometres (25 mi) south of Hohhot, Inner Mongolia.

The Tuoba clan of the Xianbei people made Shengle their political center during the mid-3rd century, and subsequently experienced a pronounced political rise. It served as the capital of the Dai state, and as the first capital of the Northern Wei. Towards the end of the 4th century, the Northern Wei focused its conquests south, and ultimately moved its capital from Shengle to Pingcheng, which was located further south.

The site would later become the capital of the Zhenwu County of the Liao dynasty.

The archaeological ruins of Shengle were unearthed in 1971. Parts of the rammed-earth walls of the ancient city are still intact. The peripheral walls run 1,550 metres (5,090 ft) from east to west and 2,250 metres (7,380 ft) from north to south.

== History ==
The area of Shengle was historically inhabited by various nomadic peoples. Prior to inhabitation by the Xianbei, the area was dominated by the Xiongnu people. Most of the Xiongnu who previously inhabited the area moved westwards, enabling the Xianbei and Wuhuan to migrate to the area, although some Xiongnu stayed behind.

During the mid-3rd century, Tuoba Liwei, the first leader of the Tuoba clan of the Xianbei, encouraged his fellow Tuoba to move to Shengle, then part of Chengle County, within the Dingxiang Commandery. During the 3rd century, the commandery was abandoned due to the Xiongnu invasions. During this time, the Tuoba clan experienced a pronounced political rise.

In 312 CE, Tuoba leader Tuoba Yilu, the first leader of the Dai, briefly made Pingcheng the state's southern capital, while Shengle served only as its northern capital. After his death in 316 CE, Dai leadership abandoned Pingcheng as its southern capital, and Shengle once again served as its sole political center.

Upon the establishment of the Northern Wei dynasty in 386 CE, following the fall of the Dai, the Northern Wei retained Shengle as its capital. However, as it conquered more land to its south from the Later Yan, the Tuoba clan shifted its political weight further south. During this time, the political importance of Pingcheng grew significantly.

In 398 CE, under the reign of Tuoba Gui, the capital of the Northern Wei dynasty was moved from Shengle to Pingcheng.

=== Excavations ===
The archaeological ruins of the city of Shengle were unearthed in 1971. Previously, other relics spanning from the Warring States Period to the Ming dynasty were discovered at the site.

== Geography ==
The site of Shengle is located in present-day Horinger County, in Hohhot, Inner Mongolia. It is in the south of the Yin Mountains, and north of the Great Wall of China.

== Economy ==
During Shengle's time as the political center of the Tuoba clan, its economy was primarily nomadic, although agriculture was also practiced.

== Culture ==
Chinese historian Fengwen Peng contends that, during its time as the center of the Tuoba, Shengle exhibited political and cultural elements which drew from both the nomadic peoples of the surrounding steppes, as well as those of the Central Plains of China. Peng also contends that the Northern Wei dynasty's shift in capital from Shengle to Pingcheng symbolizes its ascendance from a nomadic entity to a dynasty in the tradition of the Central Plains.
