= Tuoba dynasty (disambiguation) =

The Tuoba dynasty generally refers to the Northern Wei dynasty (386–535) of China, which was ruled by the Tuoba clan (later renamed the Yuan clan) of Xianbei ethnicity.

Tuoba dynasty may also refer to other dynasties ruled by the Tuoba (Yuan) clan:

- Dai (Sixteen Kingdoms) (310–376), whose rulers were ancestors to Northern Wei monarchs
- Eastern Wei (534–550), one of the short-lived successor states of the Northern Wei
- Western Wei (535–557), one of the short-lived successor states of the Northern Wei

== See also ==
- Western Xia (1038–1227), a Tangut-led Chinese dynasty whose rulers claimed to be descendants of the Tuoba clan
- Shun dynasty (1644–1646), whose ruler Li Zicheng claimed to be a descendant of the Western Xia emperors
