= Hohhot Shengle International Airport =

Future airport to serve Hohhot, Inner Mongolia, China

Hohhot Shengle International Airport 呼和浩特盛乐国际机场
- IATA: HET (once opened); ICAO: ZBHH (once opened)

Summary
- Airport type: Public
- Serves: Hohhot
- Location: Qiaoshiying, Horinger County, Hohhot, Inner Mongolia, China
- Opened: November 26, 2026; 3 days' time
- Elevation AMSL: 1,034 m (3,392 ft)
- Coordinates: 40°28′47″N 111°34′23″E

Maps
- Location of airport Shengle Airport (China)
- Interactive map of Hohhot Shengle International Airport

Runways
Direction	Length		Surface
Direction	m	ft	Surface
07/25	3,800	12,467	Concrete
08/26	3,400	11,155	Concrete

Hohhot Shengle International Airport (IATA: HET, ICAO: ZBHH) is an under-construction international airport being built to serve Hohhot, the capital of Inner Mongolia Autonomous Region in north China.

== History ==
Hohhot is currently served by Baita International Airport. With the rapid expansion of the city, the airport is now surrounded by urban area. It has no more room to expand to accommodate growing traffic, while the presence of the airport in the middle of the city has severely restricted urban development. When the extension of Baita Airport completed in 2004, the airport is designed to handle of 3 million passengers by 2015. With the expansion of Hohhot city, the airport is handled total of 13.15 million passengers in 2019, more than 4 times than normal capacity. It also serves as the main alternate airport for Beijing Capital Airport.

In April 2012, the city of Hohhot launched the project to build a new airport to replace Baita Airport. It chose a site in Qiaoshiying Township, Horinger County, south of the city center, and named it Hohhot Shengle International Airport. The name refers to Shengle, capital of the Kingdom of Dai in the 4th century CE. In September 2013, an office overseeing the construction of the airport was established in Horinger and began acquiring land and relocating residents. The Civil Aviation Administration of China evaluated the site starting in December 2013 and gave its approval in 2015. On 15 January 2019, the airport was approved by the National Development and Reform Commission.

On 20 July 2020, the new Shengle Airport is officially began construction.

== Facilities and construction ==
Shengle Airport will have two parallel runways with a distance of 2 kilometres (1.2 mi) between them, connected by taxiways. The southern runway will be 3,800 metres (12,500 ft) long and 60 metres (200 ft) wide (class 4F), and the northern runway will be 3,400 metres (11,200 ft) long and 45 metres (148 ft) wide (class 4E). It will have a 260,000-square-metre (2,800,000 sq ft) terminal building, parking aprons for 125 aircraft, a 50,000-square-metre (540,000 sq ft) transit hub, and a 95,000-square-metre (1,020,000 sq ft) parking garage. The airport is projected to serve 28 million passengers per year by 2030, as well as 320,000 tons of cargo. The total construction budget is CN¥22.37 billion.

The Baobei River (宝贝河) will be diverted for the new airport.

== Transport ==
Shengle Airport will be served by the planned Line 4 of Hohhot Metro.
