= AD 365 =

365 in various calendars
Gregorian calendar	365; CCCLXV
Ab urbe condita	1118
Assyrian calendar	5115
Balinese saka calendar	286–287
Bengali calendar	−229 – −228
Berber calendar	1315
Buddhist calendar	909
Burmese calendar	−273
Byzantine calendar	5873–5874
Chinese calendar	甲子年 (Wood Rat); 3062 or 2855 — to — 乙丑年 (Wood Ox); 3063 or 2856
Coptic calendar	81–82
Discordian calendar	1531
Ethiopian calendar	357–358
Hebrew calendar	4125–4126
- Hindu calendars
Vikram Samvat	421–422
Shaka Samvat	286–287
Kali Yuga	3465–3466
Holocene calendar	10365
Iranian calendar	257 BP – 256 BP
Islamic calendar	265 BH – 264 BH
Javanese calendar	247–248
Julian calendar	365; CCCLXV
Korean calendar	2698
Minguo calendar	1547 before ROC 民前1547年
Nanakshahi calendar	−1103
Seleucid era	676/677 AG
Thai solar calendar	907–908
Tibetan calendar	阳木鼠年 (male Wood-Rat); 491 or 110 or −662 — to — 阴木牛年 (female Wood-Ox); 492 or 111 or −661

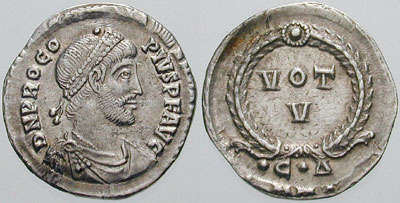
Procopius (Roman usurper)

Year 365 (CCCLXV) was a common year starting on Saturday of the Julian calendar. At the time, it was known in the West as the Year of the Consulship of Augustus and Valens (or, less frequently, year 1118 Ab urbe condita). The denomination 365 for this year has been used since the early medieval period, when the Anno Domini calendar era became the prevalent method in Europe for naming years.

== Events ==
=== By place ===
==== Roman Empire ====
- July 21 – An earthquake and tsunami devastate Crete and Alexandria and affects Italy, Greece, and Palestine.
- September 28 – Procopius revolts and bribes two legions passing by Constantinople. He proclaims himself Emperor, and takes control of Thrace and Bithynia.
- November 1 – The Alamanni cross the Rhine and invade Gaul. Emperor Valentinian I moves to Paris to command the army and defend the Gallic cities.

==== China ====
- March 30 – Sixteen Kingdoms: Jin Feidi, age 23, succeeds his brother Jin Aidi as emperor of the Eastern Jin Dynasty. He has no actual power; governmental matters are largely in the hands of his granduncle Sima Yu.

=== By topic ===
==== Religion ====
- Basil of Caesarea becomes presbyter of Caesarea.
- Emperor Valens orders the expulsion of the Alexandrian bishop Athanasius from his see, but instead of going into exile Athanasius, now about 67, moves to the outskirts of Alexandria.
- Antipope Felix II dies after a 9-year reign, ending the double occupancy of the papacy.

== Births ==
- Julius Agricola, Roman consul and praetorian prefect
- Kou Qianzhi, Chinese high official and taoist (d. 448)
- Tao Yuanming, Chinese poet and politician (d. 427)
- Tufa Rutan, Chinese prince of the Southern Liang (d. 415)

== Deaths ==
- March 30 – Ai of Jin (or Qianling), Chinese emperor (b. 341)
- November 22 – Felix II, antipope of Rome (b. 287)
- Feng Yi (or Zizhuan), Chinese official and general
- Sima Xun (or Weichang), Chinese warlord (b. 306)
- Wang Muzhi, Chinese empress of the Jin Dynasty
