= Son of Tuoba Pugen =

- Prince of Dai

Prince of Dai
- Reign: 316
- Predecessor: Tuoba Pugen
- Successor: Tuoba Yulü
- Born: 316
- Died: 316
Full name
- Family name: Tuòbá (拓跋); Given name: Unknown
Regnal name
- Prince of Dai (代王)
- Dynasty: Dai
- Father: Tuoba Pugen

The son of Tuoba Pugen (born and died 316) ruled as prince of the Tuoba Dai in 316. In 316, Tuoba Pugen defeated and killed his cousin, Tuoba Liuxiu (拓跋六修), to become the next Prince of Dai, succeeding Tuoba Yilu. However, his reign only lasted a few months before he died of illness. His first and only son, whose name was either never recorded or never given at all, was born at the time of his death, so Pugen's mother, Lady Qi, installed him as the new Prince of Dai. However, he also died by the end of the year. The people of Dai thus chose his cousin, Tuoba Yulü, to succeed him.

Prince of Dai House of Tuoba Born: 316 Died: 316
Chinese royalty
Preceded by Tuoba Pugen	Prince of Dai; 316	Succeeded by Tuoba Yulü
