= 341 =

341 in various calendars
Gregorian calendar	341; CCCXLI
Ab urbe condita	1094
Assyrian calendar	5091
Balinese saka calendar	262–263
Bengali calendar	−253 – −252
Berber calendar	1291
Buddhist calendar	885
Burmese calendar	−297
Byzantine calendar	5849–5850
Chinese calendar	庚子年 (Metal Rat); 3038 or 2831 — to — 辛丑年 (Metal Ox); 3039 or 2832
Coptic calendar	57–58
Discordian calendar	1507
Ethiopian calendar	333–334
Hebrew calendar	4101–4102
- Hindu calendars
Vikram Samvat	397–398
Shaka Samvat	262–263
Kali Yuga	3441–3442
Holocene calendar	10341
Iranian calendar	281 BP – 280 BP
Islamic calendar	290 BH – 289 BH
Javanese calendar	222–223
Julian calendar	341; CCCXLI
Korean calendar	2674
Minguo calendar	1571 before ROC 民前1571年
Nanakshahi calendar	−1127
Seleucid era	652/653 AG
Thai solar calendar	883–884
Tibetan calendar	ལྕགས་ཕོ་བྱི་བ་ལོ་ (male Iron-Rat); 467 or 86 or −686 — to — ལྕགས་མོ་གླང་ལོ་ (female Iron-Ox); 468 or 87 or −685

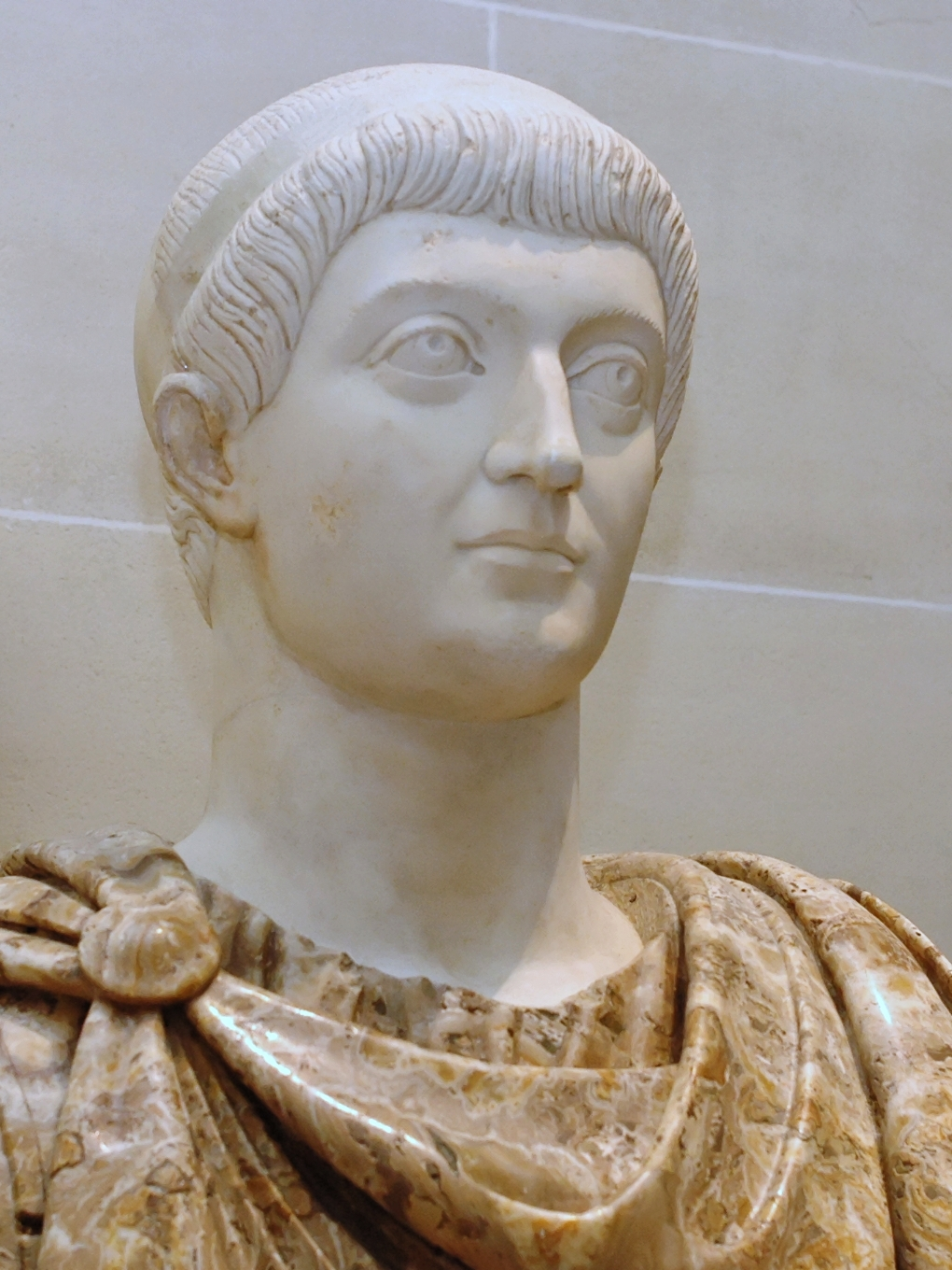
Emperor Constans I (c. 320–350)

Year 341 (CCCXLI) was a common year starting on Thursday of the Julian calendar. At the time, it was known as the Year of the Consulship of Marcellinus and Probinus (or, less frequently, year 1094 ab Urbe condita). The denomination 341 for this year has been used since the early medieval period, when the Anno Domini calendar era became the prevalent method in Europe for naming years or dates.

== Events ==
=== By place ===
==== Roman Empire ====
- Emperor Constans I bans pagan sacrifices and magic rituals, under penalty of death.
- Constans I begins a successful campaign against the Franks.

==== India ====
- Samudragupta of the Gupta Empire, during a decade, extends his kingdom and his influence. A pillar found at Allahabad sings his praises.

=== By topic ===
==== Religion ====
- The Council of Encaenia is held in Antioch.
- Paul I is restored as Patriarch of Constantinople.
- Thousands of Christians are executed at Seleucia in Mesopotamia.
- Coptic Christianity is introduced into Ethiopia by the Syrian apostle Frumentius. He and his colleague Aedesius ware captured by Ethiopians a year or two ago, and have become civil servants at the Aksumite court of King Ezana. Ezana is impressed with Frumentius' teachings and converts to Christianity. Frumentius becomes the first Bishop of Axum and encourages the Christian merchants present in the country to practise their faith openly.

== Births ==
- Ai of Jin (or Qianling), Chinese emperor (d. 365)

== Deaths ==
- Asterius of Cappadocia, Christian theologian and writer
- Du Lingyang (or Du Ling), Chinese empress (b. 321)
- Eusebius of Nicomedia, archbishop of Constantinople
- Ge Hong (or Ko Hung), Chinese taoist (approximate date)
- Paul of Thebes, Christian hermit (approximate date)
- Potamon of Heraclea, Christian bishop and martyr
