= Liu Xi (Liao dynasty) =

Liu Xi (Chinese: 劉晞) was an official of the Khitan-led Liao dynasty of China, at one point serving as a chancellor.

== Background ==
It is not known when Liu Xi was born, but it is known that he was from Zhuo Prefecture (涿州, in modern Baoding, Hebei). His father Liu Jiyong (劉濟雍) served as a county magistrate for several counties in Zhuo. In Liu Xi's youth, he was known for his being well-studied in Confucianism in his home territory. At one point, he served as a secretary to the major Jin general Zhou Dewei, before he was captured by Liao.

== Career with Liao ==
After being captured by Liao, Liu Xi was given various offices in dealing with fellow ethnic Han that Liao captured. During the Tianfu era (936-947) of Liao's vassal Later Jin, Liu was made the defender of Yanjing (燕京, in modern Beijing). He was responsible for the imperial examinations three times, and reached the chancellor title of Tong Zhongshu Menxia Pingzhangshi (同中書門下平章事). (According to the Zizhi Tongjian, he also at one point served as Emperor Taizong's chief of staff (Shumishi).)

In 946, Liu accompanied Emperor Taizong on his campaign to destroy Later Jin, whose then-emperor Shi Chonggui was no longer willing to be Liao's vassal. After Emperor Taizong was successful in destroy Later Jin, he declared himself the emperor of China as well, and then proceeded to install a number of Liao generals in various military positions over the former Later Jin realms. As part of his orders, Liu was made the defender of Luoyang. Prior to his arrival at Luoyang, Luoyang had been temporarily under the charge of the Khitan general Yelü Chage (耶律察割), the Xi prince Zhuaila (拽剌), and the Balhae general Gao Mohan (高謨翰), all of whom viewed the Han with disdain. When the general Zhao Zaili (趙在禮), on the way to the former Later Jin capital Daliang to pay homage to Emperor Taizong, stopped at Luoyang, they, without humility, accept his bows. Zhao, in fear, later committed suicide. When Liu arrived at Luoyang, he ordered Zhuaila to stand in his office hall and rebuked him, "Zhao Zaili was an important Han official. You are but a simple chieftain of the north. How do you dare to be so arrogant toward him?" It was said that after this rebuke was known, the people of Luoyang were somewhat comforted.

Emperor Taizong did not rule the former Later Jin realm well, however, and soon, this caused many Han rebellions against him. Emperor Taizong decided to leave his brother-in-law Xiao Han in charge of Daliang, and headed back toward Liao proper. When some agrarian rebels subsequently attacked Luoyang, Liu abandoned Luoyang and fled to Xu Prefecture (許州, in modern Xuchang, Henan). Shortly after, Xiao had Gao escort Liu back to Luoyang, where he again took charge of the city. However, after Emperor Taizong soon died near Heng Prefecture (恆州, in modern Shijiazhuang, Hebei), and his nephew Yelü Ruan claimed the throne (as Emperor Shizong), and one of the major Later Jin generals, Liu Zhiyuan, claimed imperial title and headed toward Luoyang, Liu again abandoned Luoyang and fled to Daliang. Soon, Xiao decided to abandon Daliang as well, and he named the Later Tang prince Li Congyi emperor, before leaving Li Congyi at Daliang and heading north back toward Heng with Liu. A subsequent Han uprising at Heng caused him to flee with Yelü Mada (耶律麻荅) and Cui Tingxun (崔廷勳) to Ding Prefecture (定州, in modern Baoding, Hebei) to join Yelü Zhong (耶律忠) the military governor of Yiwu Circuit (義武, headquartered at Ding). That was the last definitively described movement of Liu's, although presumably, when Yelü Zhong and Yelü Mada then abandoned Ding in 948 and fled back to Liao proper, Liu went with them. He was said to have died while still in Liao territory.

== Notes and references ==
- Old History of the Five Dynasties, vol. 98.
- Zizhi Tongjian, vols. 286, 287.
