= Horinger County =

Horinger County 和林格尔县 • ᠬᠣᠷᠢᠨ ᠭᠡᠷ ᠰᠢᠶᠠᠨ
- County
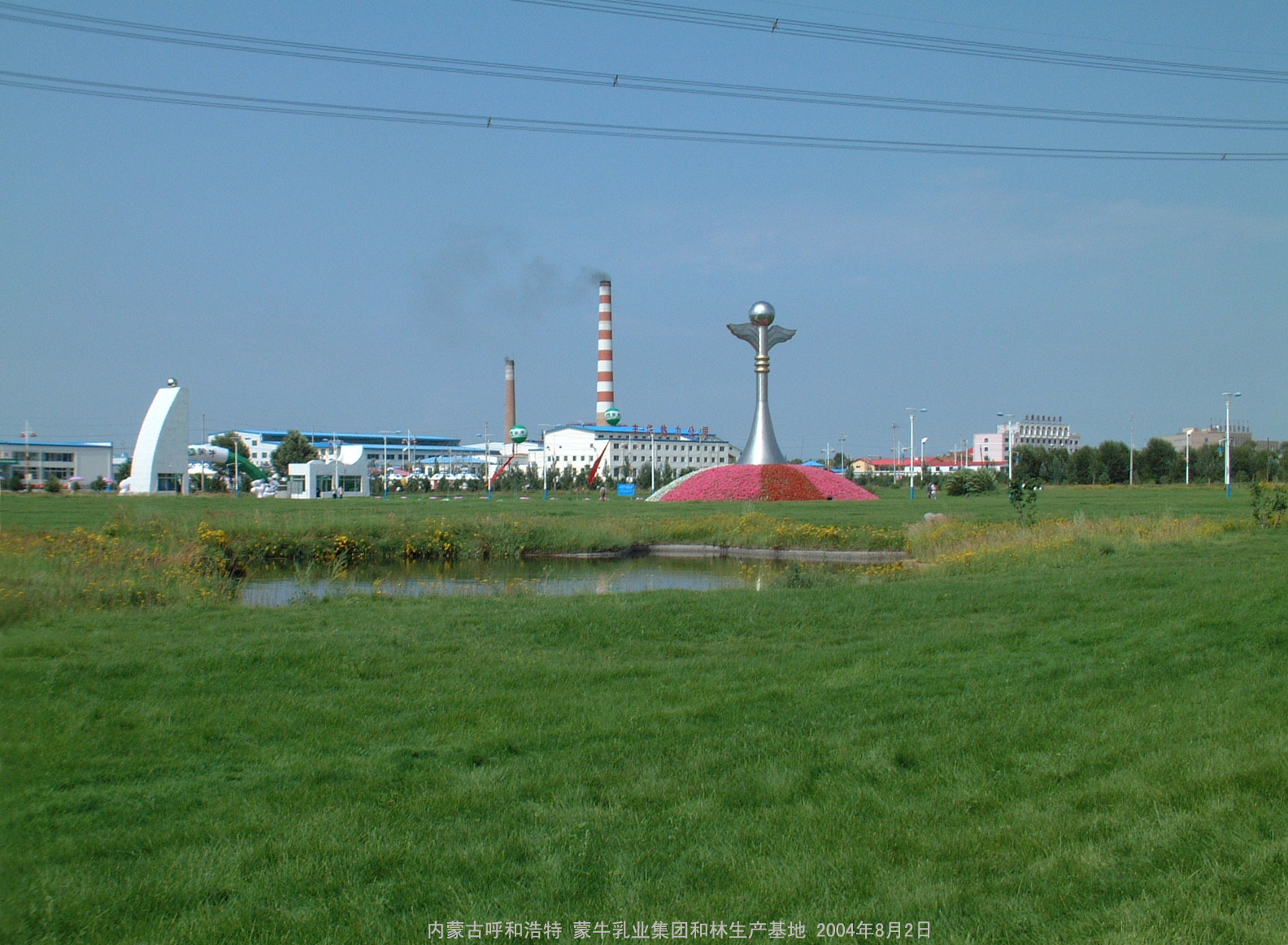

- Location of the seat in Inner Mongolia Horinger (China)
- Coordinates: 40.379°N 111.828°E
- Country: China
- Autonomous region: Inner Mongolia
- Prefecture-level city: Huhhot
- County seat: Chengguan Town

Area
  - Total: 3,401 km^{2} (1,313 sq mi)
- Elevation: 1,100 m (3,600 ft)

Population (2020)
  - Total: 162,476
  - Density: 47.77/km^{2} (123.7/sq mi)
- Time zone: UTC+8 (China Standard)
- Postal code: 011500
- Area code: 0471
- Website: www.helin.gov.cn

Horinger County

Chinese name
- Simplified Chinese: 和林格尔县
- Traditional Chinese: 和林格爾縣
Transcriptions
Standard Mandarin
- Hanyu Pinyin: Hélíngé'ěr xiàn

Mongolian name
- Mongolian Cyrillic: Хорингэр шянь
- Mongolian script: ᠬᠣᠷᠢᠨ ᠭᠡᠷ ᠰᠢᠶᠠᠨ
Transcriptions
- SASM/GNC: Qorin Ger siyan

Horinger (Mongolian: ᠬᠣᠷᠢᠨ ᠭᠡᠷ ᠰᠢᠶᠠᠨ; Chinese: 和林格尔县) is a county of Inner Mongolia Autonomous Region, North China, it is under the administration of the prefecture-level city of Hohhot, the capital of Inner Mongolia, bordering Shanxi province to the southeast.

== History ==
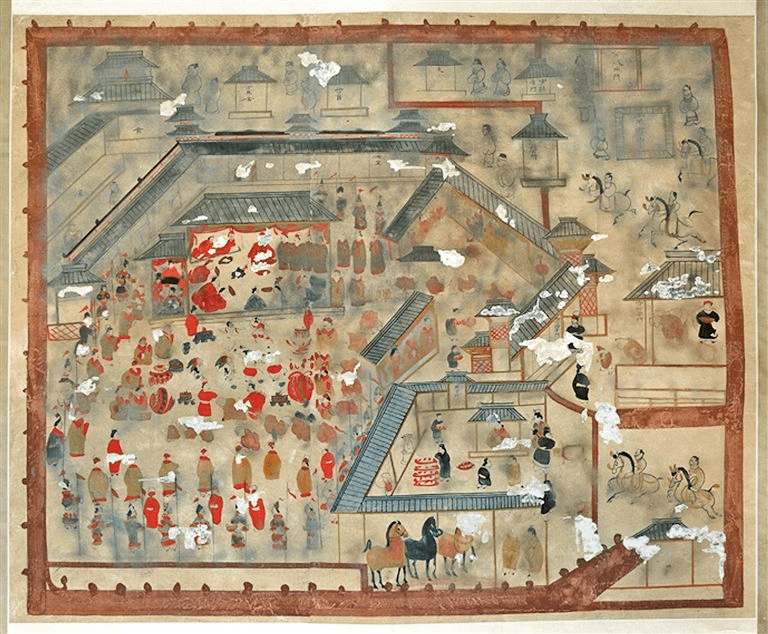
An Eastern Han (25–220) period Chinese mural of a mufu conference conducted by the Commandant-protector of the Wuhuan (护乌桓校尉) at his manor, from a Han tomb in Horinger, Inner Mongolia

The site of Shengle (盛樂) to the northwest of the present-day county seat of Horinger was the capital of the Xianbei Kingdom of Dai during the Sixteen Kingdoms Period of Chinese history.

Construction on a Huawei-owned data center cluster began in Horinger County on 8 October 2023, and was mostly complete by June 2025. On 12 July 2025, five different data centers, including the Huawei one, were officially inaugurated on the occasion of the "Green Computing Power Conference" in Hohhot. According to Epoch AI, the Huawei data center is thought to use Huawei Ascend chips. In addition, the county is also home to data centers run by the Agricultural Bank of China, China Mobile, and China Telecom.

== Administrative divisions ==
Horinger County is made up of 4 towns and 4 townships.

Name	Simplified Chinese	Hanyu Pinyin	Mongolian (Hudum Script)	Mongolian (Cyrillic)	Administrative division code
Towns
Chengguan Town	城关镇	Chéngguān Zhèn	ᠴᠧᠩ ᠭᠤᠸᠠᠨ ᠪᠠᠯᠭᠠᠰᠤ	Цэн гуан балгас	150123100
Shengle Town	盛乐镇	Shènglè Zhèn	ᠱᠧᠩ ᠯᠧ ᠪᠠᠯᠭᠠᠰᠤ	Шен ле балгас	150123101
Xindianzi Town	新店子镇	Xīndiànzi Zhèn	ᠰᠢᠨ ᠳ᠋ᠢᠶᠠᠨ ᠽᠢ ᠪᠠᠯᠭᠠᠰᠤ	Шин даяан зи балгас	150123102
Qorjin Ail Town	巧什营镇	Qiǎoshíyíng Zhèn	ᠴᠣᠷᠵᠢ ᠶᠢᠨ ᠠᠢᠯ ᠪᠠᠯᠭᠠᠰᠤ	Цоржийн айл балгас	150123103
Townships
Xabhai Township	舍必崖乡	Shěbìyá Xiāng	ᠱᠠᠪᠠᠬᠠᠢ ᠰᠢᠶᠠᠩ	Шавхай шиян	150123203
Dahongcheng Township	大红城乡	Dàhóngchéng Xiāng	ᠳ᠋ᠠ ᠬᠤᠩ ᠴᠧᠩ ᠰᠢᠶᠠᠩ	Да хон цэн шиян	150123205
Yangqungou Township	羊群沟乡	Yángqúngōu Xiāng	ᠶᠠᠩ ᠴᠢᠶᠦ᠋ᠨ ᠭᠧᠦ ᠰᠢᠶᠠᠩ	Ян чион гүү шиян	150123206
Heilaoyao Township	黑老夭乡	Hēilǎoyāo Xiāng	ᠾᠧᠢ ᠯᠣᠤ ᠶᠣᠤ ᠰᠢᠶᠠᠩ	Гей луу ёо шиян	150123207

Others:

- Shengle Economic Industrial Park (盛乐经济工业园区, ᠱᠧᠩ ᠯᠧ
  ᠠᠵᠤ ᠠᠬᠤᠢ ᠶᠢᠨ
  ᠲᠣᠭᠣᠷᠢᠭ)
- Inner Mongolia Horinger New Area (内蒙古和林格尔新区, ᠥᠪᠥᠷ
  ᠮᠣᠩᠭᠣᠯ ᠤᠨ
  ᠬᠣᠷᠢᠨᠭᠡᠷ
  ᠰᠢᠨ᠎ᠡ
  ᠲᠣᠭᠣᠷᠢᠭ)

== Climate ==
Climate data for Horinger, elevation 1,167 m (3,829 ft), (1991–2020 normals, extremes 1981–2010)
Month	Jan	Feb	Mar	Apr	May	Jun	Jul	Aug	Sep	Oct	Nov	Dec	Year
Record high °C (°F)	8.9 (48.0)	16.9 (62.4)	24.2 (75.6)	33.7 (92.7)	39.8 (103.6)	39.7 (103.5)	37.9 (100.2)	35.6 (96.1)	34.2 (93.6)	26.9 (80.4)	19.0 (66.2)	13.8 (56.8)	39.8 (103.6)
Mean daily maximum °C (°F)	−4.2 (24.4)	0.9 (33.6)	8.3 (46.9)	16.8 (62.2)	23.2 (73.8)	27.7 (81.9)	29.1 (84.4)	27.2 (81.0)	22.1 (71.8)	14.7 (58.5)	5.3 (41.5)	−2.5 (27.5)	14.1 (57.3)
Daily mean °C (°F)	−12.0 (10.4)	−6.8 (19.8)	1.2 (34.2)	9.5 (49.1)	16.3 (61.3)	21.0 (69.8)	22.8 (73.0)	20.8 (69.4)	15.1 (59.2)	7.5 (45.5)	−1.5 (29.3)	−9.6 (14.7)	7.0 (44.6)
Mean daily minimum °C (°F)	−17.4 (0.7)	−12.6 (9.3)	−5.0 (23.0)	2.4 (36.3)	8.9 (48.0)	14.1 (57.4)	16.9 (62.4)	15.0 (59.0)	9.2 (48.6)	1.8 (35.2)	−6.4 (20.5)	−14.6 (5.7)	1.0 (33.8)
Record low °C (°F)	−31.3 (−24.3)	−28.4 (−19.1)	−22.8 (−9.0)	−11.2 (11.8)	−4.0 (24.8)	1.3 (34.3)	6.5 (43.7)	3.9 (39.0)	−3.1 (26.4)	−10.2 (13.6)	−26.0 (−14.8)	−33.1 (−27.6)	−33.1 (−27.6)
Average precipitation mm (inches)	2.4 (0.09)	4.4 (0.17)	9.3 (0.37)	18.9 (0.74)	34.1 (1.34)	49.2 (1.94)	105.6 (4.16)	76.9 (3.03)	56.3 (2.22)	25.5 (1.00)	9.9 (0.39)	3.5 (0.14)	396 (15.59)
Average precipitation days (≥ 0.1 mm)	2.6	2.8	3.7	4.2	6.8	8.9	12.2	10.6	9.1	5.4	3.4	2.8	72.5
Average snowy days	3.9	3.9	3.6	1.2	0.2	0	0	0	0	0.6	3.0	4.1	20.5
Average relative humidity (%)	61	54	45	38	40	48	61	65	64	60	60	60	55
Mean monthly sunshine hours	216.8	216.0	253.1	274.7	293.0	276.7	254.9	252.6	231.3	230.3	199.5	201.7	2,900.6
Percentage possible sunshine	72	71	68	69	65	62	56	60	63	68	68	70	66
Source: China Meteorological Administration

== Transport ==
- China National Highway 209
- Inner Mongolia Provincial Highway 210
- Fengzhun Railway
- Hohhot Shengle International Airport

== Economy ==
- GDP: RMB ¥7.82 billion in 2006
- Pillar industries: milk industry, wool industry, forestry, lamb and beef industry
- Mengniu, the biggest manufacturer of dairy products in China, is based in Horinger.

== Education ==
- At year-end of 2006, there are 46 primary and secondary schools and 4 kindergartens in the city.
- Number of students enrolled at year-end of 2006: 655 in kindergartens, 10962 in primary schools, 10241 in junior high schools, 4417 in senior high schools.
- Number of teachers at year-end of 2006: 1834 full-time teachers and staff
- Percentage of children of the right age attending primary school in 2006: 100%
- Percentage of primary school graduates entering a higher school in 2006: 100%
- Percentage of junior high graduates entering a higher school in 2006: 83.59%

== Health ==
- Number of medical entities at year-end of 2005: 14
- Number of health-care entities at year-end of 2005: 1
- Number of hospital beds at year-end of 2005: 178
- Number of medical doctors, registered nurses and medical technicians at year end of 2005: 230
