= Liu Taigong =

First living Retired Emperor in Chinese history (died 197 BC)

- Born: 282 BC? Feng (present-day Feng County, Jiangsu, China)
- Died: c.June 197 BC (aged 85); Yueyang
- Spouse: Wang Hanshi; Lady Li
- Issue: Liu Bo; Liu Xi; Emperor Gaozu; Liu Jiao; Empress Zhao'ai
Names
- Family name: Liu (劉) Given name: Tuan (煓) Courtesy name: Zhijia (執嘉) (Note: This is per part 1 of vol.71 of New Book of Tang. In vol.27 of Book of Song, this name was recorded as Liu Taigong's given name.)
Posthumous name
- Emperor Da (大皇帝)
Temple name
- Shizu (始祖)
- Father: Liu Ren

Liu Taigong (Chinese: 劉太公), personal name Liu Tuan (Chinese: 劉煓), was the father of Liu Bang (Emperor Gaozu of Han).

== Life ==
Not much is recorded about Taigong historically. He was born and likely lived his early life in Feng town (豐邑) of Pei County, in present-day Feng County, Jiangsu. His personal name is not known. Some historical sources says his name is Liu Zhijia (Chinese:劉執嘉), although this name is likely chosen after Liu Bang became Emperor. He likely came from a humble, rural background.

One ancestor of Liu Taigong was traced back to Liu Lei (劉累) during the Xia Dynasty. Liu Lei was a descendant of Emperor Yao. Legend has it that he was named Liu Lei because he had the words "劉累" written on his palm when he was born, and he was skilled in raised dragons. Liu Lei's descendant Shi Hui had a son, who changed his surname to Liu and was the ancestor of Taigong.

During the Han-Chu War, Liu Taigong was captured by Chu troops during the Battle of Pengcheng. Xiang Yu once placed Taigong on a chopping block and threatened Liu Bang: "If you don't surrender now, I will cook Taigong." Liu Bang replied: "I and Xiang Yu both received orders from King Huai of Chu and swore to be brothers. My father is therefore your father. If you insist on boiling your father, do send me a share of the soup." Enraged Xiang Yu meant to kill Taigong, but Xiang Bo persuaded him not to. Later, the Han army grew strong with ample provisions, while Xiang Yu's troops were worn out and ran out of food. Liu Bang sent Hou Gong to negotiate with Xiang Yu and finally agreed to divide the realm equally. Taigong was thus released.

After Taigong's son Liu Bang became emperor, Liu Bang continued to visit his father once a week. However, upon hearing from an advisor that it was no longer appropriate for Taigong to "receive" his son, as Taigong was technically one of his subjects, Taigong began to greet his son in deprecatory fashion, honoring the latter's status as emperor. Upon learning the reason behind his father's actions, Liu Bang honored Taigong with the title Taishang Huang on 4 July 201 BCE, a year after Liu Bang declared himself emperor in February 202 BCE. The title nominally elevated Liu's status in court protocol as to remain consistent with Confucian norms of filial piety.

Taigong died at a palace in the city of Yueyang in c.June 197 BC. On 9 August 197 BC, he was entombed in present-day Lintong District, Xi'an.

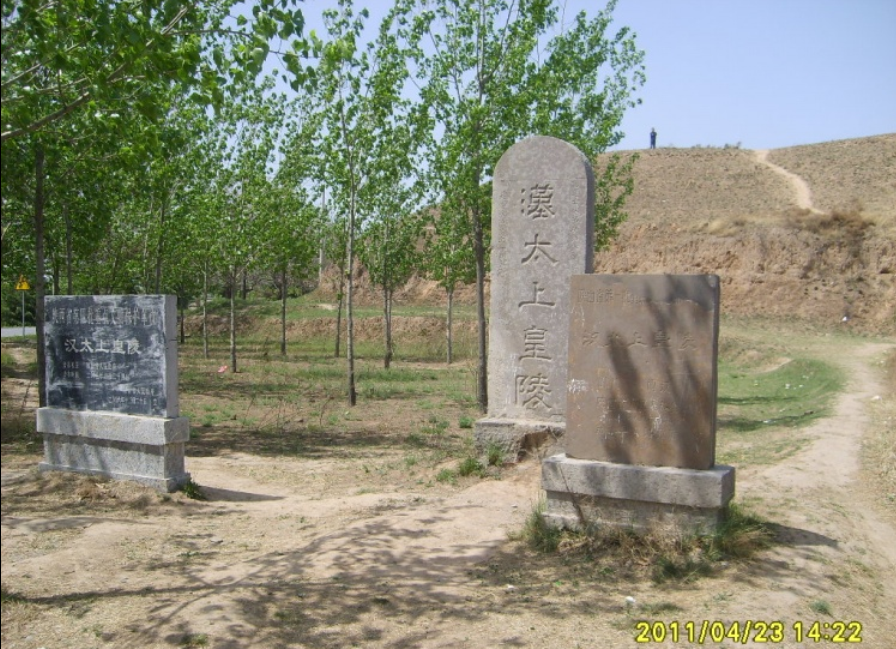
The "Tomb of the Grand Emperor of Han" (漢太上皇陵), in Xi'an, Shaanxi

== Consorts and issue ==
- Wang Hanshi (王含始), also known as Liu Ao (劉媪, "Old woman Liu", died before 202 BC), posthumously honored as Empress Zhaoling (昭靈皇后)
  - Liu Bo, Prince Wu'ai (武哀王 劉伯; b. 262 BC, died before 202 BC), first son
  - Liu Xi, Prince Qing of Wu (吳頃王 劉喜; 260–193 BC), second son
  - Empress Zhao'ai (昭哀皇后)
  - Liu Bang, Emperor Gao (高皇帝 劉邦; 256–195 BC), third son
  - Liu Jiao, Prince Yuan of Chu (楚元王 劉交; d. 179 BC), fourth son
- Retired Empress, of the Li clan (太上皇后 李氏; died c.June 197 BC)

== Notes ==
Honorary titles
New title	Retired Emperor of China; 201 BC – 197 BC	Vacant Title next held by Emperor Hui of Jin
