= Dai (Sixteen Kingdoms) =

Chinese state (310–376)

Dai 代
- 310–376
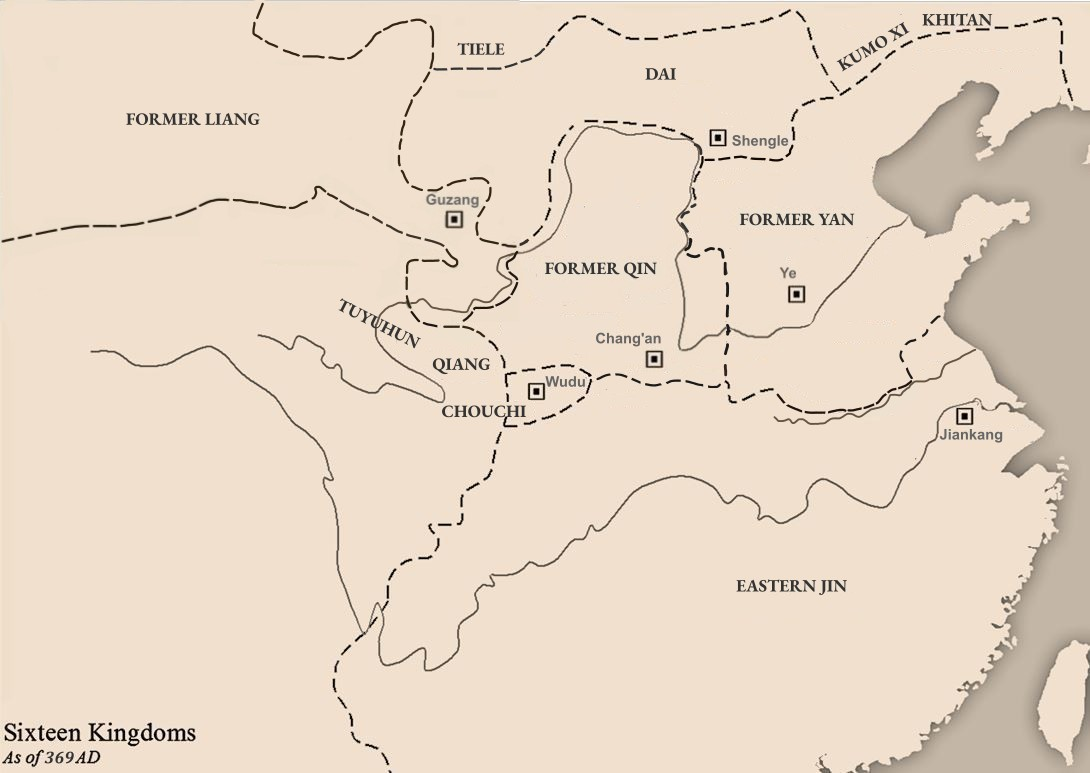
- China in 369 CE. Dai is visible at the top of the map.
- Status: Vassal of Jin Dynasty, Later Zhao, Former Yan, Former Qin
- Capital: Shengle (310–324, 337–338, 340–376); Mount Dongmugen (324–327); Daning (327–337); Fanji (338–340)
- Government: Monarchy
- Prince
  - 310–316: Tuoba Yilu
  - 338–376: Tuoba Shiyijian
- History
  - Established: 310
  - Status upgraded from dukedom to principality: 315
  - Disestablished: 376
| Preceded by | Succeeded by |
| Western Jin | Former Qin |
- Today part of: China; Mongolia

Dai
- Traditional Chinese: 代國
- Simplified Chinese: 代国
- Literal meaning: State of Dai
Transcriptions
Standard Mandarin
- Hanyu Pinyin: Dàiguó
- Wade–Giles: Tai-kuo

Dai, also rendered as Tai and sometimes known in historiography as the Tuoba Dai (Chinese: 拓跋代), was a dynastic state of China ruled by the Tuoba clan of Xianbei descent, during the era of Sixteen Kingdoms (although it is not listed as one of the 16). It existed from AD 310 to 376, with its capital at Shengle (near modern Horinger County of Hohhot, Inner Mongolia, China).

The name "Dai" originated when Tuoba Yilu was appointed the Duke of Dai (代公) by the Western Jin dynasty in 310, as a reward for helping Liu Kun, the Governor of Bingzhou (并州), fight against the Han-Zhao dynasty. The fief was later promoted from a duchy to a principality in 315. Dai was conquered in 376 by the Former Qin dynasty, and its descendants later established the Northern Wei dynasty in 386.

== History ==
=== Background ===
In 258, the Tuoba chieftain, Tuoba Liwei led his people to occupy the abandoned Han dynasty city of Shengle in Yunzhong Commandery. At Shengle, Liwei submitted to the Cao Wei and later the Western Jin, and he began subjugating neighbouring tribes to expand his influence. Despite the Tuoba's vassalage, the Jin court was wary of their growing power. Before Liwei's death in 277, the Jin sowed discord among the Tuoba chieftains and coerced Liwei into killing his heir, Tuoba Shamohan. As a result, the Tuoba were in disarray for many years after Liwei died, and when Tuoba Luguan became chieftain in 294, he decided to split the Tuoba domain into three. Luguan retained control over the east while his nephew, Tuoba Yituo held the central and his other nephew, Tuoba Yilu ruled the west.

In 304, the tribes of the Five Divisions in Bing province rebelled and established the Han-Zhao dynasty while the Jin princes were in civil war. Though divided, the Tuoba saw the newly-formed Han state as a common threat and thus cooperated with each other to provide Jin with cavalry support against them. After Tuoba Yituo and Tuoba Luguan died in succession, Tuoba Yilu was acclaimed supreme chief and reunified the Tuoba in 307. He later formed an alliance with the Jin Inspector of Bing, Liu Kun after assisting him in putting down the rebellion of the Tiefu chieftain, Liu Hu in 310.

=== Reign of Tuoba Yilu ===
Tuoba Yilu and Liu Kun became sworn brothers, and as reward for helping him, Liu Kun petitioned the Jin court to bestow Yilu the title of Duke of Dai. The Tuoba became a vital fighting force for Jin in their war against Han, with Liu Kun being almost entirely dependent on their military strength. Shortly after attaining his fief, Yilu forced Liu Kun to grant him five counties north of the mountain ranges. In 312, after Liu Kun lost his capital, Jinyang, Yilu sent his forces to successfully reclaim it for him. For his services, the Jin court elevated Yilu's title to Prince of Dai and allowed him to grant offices to his subordinates in 315.

Yilu showed preference towards his younger son, Tuoba Biyan (拓跋比延), which upset his older son, Tuoba Liuxiu (拓跋六脩). In 316, after Liuxiu refused to take orders from his father, Yilu led his troops to punish him but was instead killed in battle. Dai was entered a state of confusion, with its people suspecting and killing one another or fleeing the state. Yilu's nephew, Tuoba Pugen managed to kill Liuxiu and proclaimed himself the new Prince of Dai, but he was unable to put an end to the crisis.

=== Period of instability ===
Tuoba Pugen died shortly after, and while his unnamed son succeeded him, he too would die later that same year. Therefore, the chieftains acclaimed his cousin, Tuoba Yulü as the new prince. During his reign, Yulü further weakened the Tiefu and allegedly expanded his territory by conquering the former lands of the Wusun in the west and the lands west of the Mohe people in the east. However, in 321, he was assassinated by Tuoba Yituo's widow, Lady Qi, who installed her son, Tuoba Heru to the throne.

As regent, Lady Qi submitted to the Later Zhao dynasty, whose people referred to Dai at the time as a "queendom" (女國). Heru began exercising power in 324 and moved the capital to Mount Dongmugen (東木根山; northwest of present-day Xinghe County, Inner Mongolia), but he soon died in 325 and was succeeded by his brother, Tuoba Hena. In 327, threatened by Later Zhao, Hena shifted the capital again to Daning (大寧; in present-day Zhangjiakou, Hebei). Throughout his rule, Hena's claim to the throne was challenged by Tuoba Yihuai, Tuoba Yulü's son who had escaped the aftermath of his father's death and went into exile. In 329, Hena fled to the Yuwen tribe after the Dai chiefs replaced him with Yihuai, but in 335, he was welcomed back and reinstated as Yihuai lost support. Yihuai fled to the Later Zhao before returning to Dai with an army and reclaiming the throne at Shengle in 337.

=== Reign of Tuoba Shiyiqian ===
Before his death in 338, Tuoba Yihuai ordered his chieftains to welcome back his brother, Tuoba Shiyiqian, who was hostage in Later Zhao, and acclaim him as the new prince. Many of them preferred his other brother, Tuoba Gu (拓跋孤), but Gu personally went to Zhao and brought Shiyiqian back to Dai. Shiyiqian ascended the throne north of Fanji (繁畤; in present-day Fanshi County, Shanxi), and he willingly split his domain with Tuoba Gu.

During Shiyiqian's reign, the Dai enjoyed a lengthy period of prosperity and reached its peak. Shiyiqian set up various new offices to handle separate administrative duties and codified the law. His territory supposedly spanned from the Yemaek in the east to the Fergana in the west, and from the Yin Mountains in the south to the northern edge of the desert. Shiyiqian had an army of 100,000 strong, and in 340, he moved the capital back to Shengle. He entered into a marriage alliance with the Former Yan, though relations were tense at times, leading to clashes between the two sides.

Throughout his rule, he also had to deal with the Tiefu tribe, who vacillated between fealty and hostility towards Dai. Shiyiqian repeatedly defeated the Tiefu, but in 376, their chieftain, Liu Weichen persuaded the Former Qin to launch a campaign against Dai. During the campaign, Tuoba Jin (拓跋斤), the son of Tuoba Gu who resented that he did have the same power as his father after his death, had Shiyiqian and many of his sons assassinated. Former Qin capitalized on the confusion and captured Yunzhong, thus ending the Dai.

Former Qin treated the defeated Tuoba clan kindly, and he allowed Shiyiqian's grandson, Tuoba Gui to live with the Dugu tribe in the old Dai territory. In 386, taking advantage of Former Qin's rapid decline that followed the Battle of Fei River, Tuoba Gui restored his family's state. Though he initially claimed the Prince of Dai title, he changed it to Prince of Wei later that year, and his state would become known in history as the Northern Wei.

== Chieftains of Tuoba Clan 219–376 (as Princes of Dai 315–376) ==
| Posthumous name | Personal name | Period of reign | Other |
|---|---|---|---|
| Shenyuan | Tuoba Liwei | 219–277 | Temple name: Shizu 始祖 |
| Zhang | Tuoba Xilu | 277–286 | |
| Ping | Tuoba Chuo | 286–293 | |
| Si | Tuoba Fu | 293–294 | |
| Zhao | Tuoba Luguan | 294–307 | |
| Huan | Tuoba Yituo | 295–305 | |
| Mu | Tuoba Yilu | 295–316 | |
| – | Tuoba Pugen | 316 | |
| – | Tuoba (Note: No known given name survives.) | 316 | |
| Pingwen | Tuoba Yulü | 316–321 | |
| Hui | Tuoba Heru | 321–325 | |
| Yang | Tuoba Hena | 325–329 and 335–337 | |
| Lie | Tuoba Yihuai | 329–335 and 337–338 | |
| Zhaocheng | Tuoba Shiyiqian | 338–376 | Era name: Jianguo 建國 |

== Tuoba clan family tree ==
Tuoba clan of Dai state family tree

Tuoba Liwei 拓拔力微; 174–219–277
Tuoba; Shamohan 拓跋沙漠汗 d. 277 | Tuoba Xilu 拓跋悉鹿 r. 277–286; d. 268 | Tuoba Chuo 拓跋綽 r. 286–293; d. 293 | Tuoba Luguan 拓跋祿官 r. 294–307; d. 307
Tuoba Fu 拓跋弗 r. 293–294; d. 294 | Tuoba Yituo 拓拔猗㐌 r. 295–305; d. 305 | Tuoba Yilu 拓跋猗盧 r. 295–316; d. 316
Tuoba Yulü 拓跋鬱律 r. 316–321; d. 321 | Tuoba Heru 拓跋賀傉 r. 321–325; d. 325 | Tuoba Pugen 拓跋普根 r. (305–)316; d. 316 | Tuoba Hena 拓跋紇那 r. 325–329; 335–337 | Tuoba Liuxiu 拓跋六修 | Tuoba Biyan 拓跋比延
Tuoba Yihuai 拓跋翳槐 r. 329–335; 337–338; d. 338 | Tuoba Shiyiqian 拓跋什翼犍; 320–338–376 | son r./d. 316
???
Tuoba Shi 拓跋寔 d. 371
Tuoba Gui 拓拔珪; 371–409; Daowu of Northern Wei; 386–409
Tuoba clan family tree of Northern Wei dynasty

== See also ==
- List of past Chinese ethnic groups
- Five Barbarians
- Yujiulü Mugulü
- Tuoba clan
