= Tuoba Yulü =

Tuoba Yulü 拓跋鬱律
- Prince of Dai

Prince of Dai
- Reign: 316–321
- Predecessor: Unnamed son of Tuoba Pugen
- Successor: Tuoba Heru
- Died: 321
Full name
- Family name: Tuòbá (拓跋); Given name: Yùlǜ (鬱律)
Regnal name
- Prince of Dai (代王)
Posthumous name
- Emperor Pingwen (平文皇帝, honored by Northern Wei)
Temple name
- Taizu (太祖, honored by Northern Wei)
- Dynasty: Dai

Tuoba Yulü (Chinese: 拓跋鬱律; pinyin: Tuòbá Yùlǜ; died 321) ruled as prince of the Tuoba Dai 316 to 321.

He was the son of Tuoba Fu, and the father of Tuoba Yihuai and Tuoba Shiyiqian. In 310, Tuoba Yulü was ordered by Tuoba Yilu to assist Liu Kun, the Governor of Bingzhou (并州) (modern Shanxi province), in fighting the Xiongnu Tiefu chieftain Liu Hu. In 316, Tuoba Yulü became the Prince of Dai upon the death of Tuoba Pugen's unnamed infant son. In 318, he defeated the Tiefu chieftain Liu Hu and also captured some territory from the Wusun. In 321 he was killed in a coup d'état launched by Pugen's widow, Lady Qi. She then installed her son, Tuoba Heru, as the new Prince of Dai.

Yulü at least had two daughters: one married He He (賀紇) the Helan chieftain, one gave birth to Liu Kuren (劉庫仁) the future Dugu chieftain.

Emperor Pingwen of Dai House of Tuoba Died: 321
Chinese royalty
Preceded by Son of Tuoba Pugen	Prince of Dai; 316–321	Succeeded by Tuoba Heru
