= Liu Zhong =

Chinese Han dynasty noble and brother of Emperor Gaozu

Liu Xi
- Traditional Chinese: 劉喜
- Simplified Chinese: 刘喜
Transcriptions
Standard Mandarin
- Hanyu Pinyin: Liǘ Xǐ
- Wade–Giles: Liu Hsi

Liu Zhong (courtesy name)
- Traditional Chinese: 劉仲
- Simplified Chinese: 刘仲
Transcriptions
Standard Mandarin
- Hanyu Pinyin: Liú Zhòng
- Wade–Giles: Liu Chung

Qingwang (posthumous name)
- Traditional Chinese: 頃王
- Simplified Chinese: 顷王
- Literal meaning: The Brief King
Transcriptions
Standard Mandarin
- Hanyu Pinyin: Qīngwáng
- Wade–Giles: Ch‘ing Wang

Liu Xi (died 193 BC), better known by his courtesy name Liu Zhong, posthumously known as Prince Qing of Dai (代顷王), was an elder brother of Emperor Gaozu, founder of China's Han dynasty. He served as marquess of Hexin, king or prince of Dai, and marquess of Heyang.

== Life ==
Liu Xi was the son of the man known to history as Liu Taigong. His elder brother, Liu Bo, (t 劉伯, s 刘伯, Liú Bó) died young, leaving Liu Xi the eldest male in the family of Liu Bang, who became the first Han emperor of China and was posthumously known as Emperor Gao(zu) ("High (Ancestor)").

After Liu Bang's establishment of the Han, Liu Xi was created Marquess of Hexin.

In 201 BC, King Xin of Han—who had been removed by the emperor from his native land to rule over the northern border from Mayi—defected to the Xiongnu. Liu Xi was named King or Prince of Dai in his place. This territory spread over the three northern commanderies of Dai, Yanmen, and Yunzhong and formed the front line between the Han state and the nomads of the Eurasian steppe. Liu Xi fled to Luoyang by himself before a Xiongnu attack in the 12th month of the 7th year of Liu Bang's reign (c.January 200 BC).

Following this display of cowardice, Liu Xi was replaced in Dai and demoted to Marquess of Heyang (t 合陽, s 合阳, Héyáng), a county southeast of present-day Heyang County.

On 30 November 196 BC, Liu Xi's son Liu Pi was made Prince or King of Wu. Liu Xi had another son, Liu Guang (刘广), who was made Marquis of De (德侯) on 8 Jan 195 BC. Liu Guang died in c.August 188 BC; he had been marquis for seven years and eight months. He was given the posthumous name "Ai" (哀).

Liu Xi died in the summer of 193 BC and was subsequently honored with the posthumous name of "Qing" ("Momentary"). As his son was a prince, he was posthumously restored to his former rank of Prince (or King).

Prince Qing of Dai House of Liu Died: 193 BC
Chinese royalty
Vacant Title last held by Chen Yu	Prince of Dai; 201 BC – 200 BC	Succeeded by Liu Ruyi
Chinese nobility
Unknown	Marquess of Hexin; 202 BC – 201 BC	Unknown
Unknown	Marquess of Heyang; 200 BC – 193 BC	Unknown Next known title holder: Liang Xi
