= Tuoba Heru =

Tuoba Heru 拓跋賀傉
- Prince of Dai

Prince of Dai
- Reign: 321–325
- Predecessor: Tuoba Yulü
- Successor: Tuoba Hena
- Died: 325
Full name
- Family name: Tuòbá (拓跋); Given name: Hèrǔ (賀傉)
Regnal name
- Prince of Dai (代王)
Posthumous name
- Emperor Hui (惠皇帝, honored by Northern Wei)
- Dynasty: Dai

Tuoba Heru (Chinese: 拓跋賀傉; pinyin: Tuòbá Hèrǔ; died 325) ruled as prince of the Tuoba Dai 321 to 325. He was the son of Tuoba Yituo, and his brothers included Tuoba Pugen and Tuoba Hena. In 321, when his cousin Tuoba Yulü was the Prince of Dai, Heru's mother, Lady Qi, launched a coup d'état against his cousin, killing Tuoba Yulü. She then installed Heru as the new Prince of Dai, but as he was still young at the time, his mother held the actual power. He only began to personally rule in 324, but would die by the end of 325. He was succeeded by Tuoba Hena.

Emperor Hui of Dai House of Tuoba Died: 325
Chinese royalty
Preceded by Tuoba Yulü	Prince of Dai; 321–325	Succeeded by Tuoba Hena
