= Tuoba Fu =

Tuoba Fu (Chinese: 拓跋弗; pinyin: Tuòbá Fú) (died 294), was the chieftain of the Tuoba in 293 and 294. He was the son of Tuoba Shamohan (拓跋沙漠汗) and his brothers included Tuoba Yituo and Tuoba Yilu. In 293, he succeeded his uncle Tuoba Chuo as the chieftain of the Tuoba. Upon his death in 294, he was succeeded by Tuoba Luguan, another one of his uncles.

His son Tuoba Yulü would also go on to become a chieftain.
