= Tuoba Yihuai =

Tuoba Yihuai 拓跋翳槐
- Prince of Dai

Prince of Dai
- Reign: 329–335
- Predecessor: Tuoba Hena
- Successor: Tuoba Hena
- Reign: 337–338
- Predecessor: Tuoba Hena
- Successor: Tuoba Shiyiqian
- Died: 338
Full name
- Family name: Tuòbá (拓跋); Given name: Yīhuái (翳槐)
Regnal name
- Prince of Dai (代王)
Posthumous name
- Emperor Lie (烈皇帝, honored by Northern Wei)
- Dynasty: Dai
- Father: Tuoba Yulü

Tuoba Yihuai (Chinese: 拓跋翳槐; pinyin: Tuòbá Yīhuái; died 338) ruled as prince of the Tuoba Dai from 329 to 335 and again from 337 to 338. He was the son of Tuoba Yulü and the nephew of Tuoba Hena. When Tuoba Hena was in his first reign as the Prince of Dai, Tuoba Yihuai lived with his maternal uncle's father Helan Aitou (賀蘭藹頭) of the Helan tribe.

Emperor Lie of Dai House of Tuoba Died: 338
Chinese royalty
Preceded by Tuoba Hena	Prince of Dai; 329–335	Succeeded by Tuoba Hena
Preceded by Tuoba Hena	Prince of Dai; 337–338	Succeeded by Tuoba Shiyiqian
