= Tuoba Luguan =

Chieftain of the Tuoba clan from 294 to 307

Tuoba Luguan (Chinese: 拓跋祿官; pinyin: Tuòbá Lùguān) (died 307), was chieftain of the Tuoba clan from 294 to 307. His father was Tuoba Liwei and his brothers included Tuoba Shamohan, Tuoba Xilu, Tuoba Chuo. In 294, Tuoba Luguan became chieftain of the Tuoba upon the death of his nephew Tuoba Fu.

In 295, Tuoba Luguan divided the territory under Tuoba control into three areas: a vast tract of land extending west from White Mountain (northeast of Zhangjiakou) to Dai (Datong, Shanxi); an eastern area from Shengle (south of Hohhot) and beyond; a central area, which included north Shanxi and the region to its north. Tuoba Luguan remained in control of the eastern area. His nephews Tuoba Yilu and Tuoba Yituo were named chieftains of the western and central areas respectively.
