= Tuoba Shiyiqian =

Prince of the Tuoba state of Dai

Tuoba Shiyiqian 拓跋什翼犍
- Prince of Dai

Prince of Dai
- Reign: 338–376
- Predecessor: Tuoba Yihuai
- Born: 320
- Died: 376 (aged 55–56)
- Issue: Tuoba Shi
Full name
- Family name: Tuòbá (拓跋); Given name: Shíyìqiàn (什翼犍)
Era name and dates
- Jiàn guó (建國): 338–376
Regnal name
- Prince of Dai (代王)
Posthumous name
- Emperor Zhaocheng (昭成皇帝, honored by Northern Wei)
Temple name
- Gaozu (高祖, honored by Northern Wei)
- Dynasty: Dai
- Father: Tuoba Yulü

Tuoba Shiyiqian (Chinese: 拓跋什翼犍; pinyin: Tuòbá Shíyìqián; 320–376) was the last prince of the Xianbei-led Dai dynasty of China and ruled from 338 to 376 when Dai was conquered by the Former Qin dynasty. He was the son of Tuoba Yulü and the younger brother of Tuoba Yihuai, whom he succeeded in 338. In 340 he moved the capital to Shengle (盛樂) (near modern Horinger County, Inner Mongolia). His grandson Tuoba Gui later founded the Northern Wei dynasty and accorded him the posthumous name Emperor Zhaocheng (昭成皇帝) and the temple name Gaozu (高祖).

== Personal information ==
Consort and issue(s):

- Princess, of the Murong clan (慕容氏), sister of Murong Huang
- Lady, of the Murong clan (慕容氏), relative of Murong Huang
- Empress Zhaocheng, of the Murong clan (昭成皇后慕容氏, d. 360), daughter of Murong Huang
  - Tuoba Shi, Emperor Xianming (獻明皇帝 拓跋寔, d. 371), second son
  - Tuoba Han (明秦王 拓跋翰), third son
  - Tuoba Yanpo (拓跋阏婆, d. 376), fourth son
  - Tuoba Shoujiu (拓跋壽鳩), eight son
- Unknown
  - Tuoba Shijun (拓跋寔君, d. 376), first son
  - Tuoba Gegen, Prince Huan of Qinghe (清河桓王 拓跋紇根), fifth son
  - Tuoba Digan (拓跋地干), sixth son
  - Tuoba Lizhen, Prince of Pengcheng (彭城王 拓跋力真), seventh son
  - Tuoba Quduo (拓跋屈咄), ninth son
  - Princess of Liaoxi (辽西公主), first daughter
    - Married He Yegan maternal nephew of Shiyijian and the Helan chieftain
  - Princess Tuoba (拓跋氏), second daughter
    - Married Liu Wuhuan
  - Princess Tuoba (拓跋氏) third daughter
  - Princess Tuoba (拓跋氏), fourth daughter

Emperor Zhaocheng of Dai House of Tuoba Born: 320 Died: 376
Chinese royalty
Preceded by Tuoba Yihuai	Prince of Dai; 338–376	Extinct
