= Tuoba Pugen =

Tuoba Pugen 拓跋普根
- Prince of Dai

Prince of Dai
- Reign: 316
- Predecessor: Tuoba Yilu
- Successor: Unnamed son
- Died: 316
Full name
- Family name: Tuòbá (拓跋); Given name: Pǔgēn (普根) or Pūsùgēn (撲速根)
Regnal name
- Prince of Dai (代王)
- Dynasty: Dai

Tuoba Pugen (Chinese: 拓跋普根; pinyin: Tuòbá Pǔgēn; died 316) was the chieftain of the central Tuoba territory from 305 to 316, and in 316 ruled as prince of the Tuoba Dai as the supreme chieftain of the Tuoba clan.

He was the son of Tuoba Yituo, and his brothers included Tuoba Heru and Tuoba Hena.

In 305, he succeeded his father Tuoba Yituo, as the chieftain of the central Tuoba territory, under his uncle Tuoba Yilu, then the Duke of Dai. In 316, Tuoba Yilu, then carrying the title the Prince of Dai, was killed by his son Tuoba Liuxiu (拓跋六修). Tuoba Pugen heard the news and attacked Tuoba Liuxiu with an armed force, killing him, and succeeded Tuoba Yilu as the Prince of Dai. In light of Tuoba Yilu's death, however, much of the ethnically Han and Wuhuan force that Tuoba Yilu commanded left Dai and gave their allegiance to the Jin official Liu Kun. Tuoba Pugen died several months later and was succeeded by his infant son, who did not have (and never got) a name.

Prince of Dai House of Tuoba Died: 316
Chinese royalty
Preceded by Tuoba Yilu	Prince of Dai; 316	Succeeded by Unnamed son
