= Tuoba =

Xianbei clan in early imperial China

- Traditional Chinese: 拓跋, 拓拔, 托跋, 托拔, 㩉拔
- Simplified Chinese: 拓跋
Transcriptions
Standard Mandarin
- Hanyu Pinyin: Tuòbá
- Wade–Giles: T'o-pa
other Mandarin
- Xiao'erjing: تُوَع بَ
- Dungan: Туәба

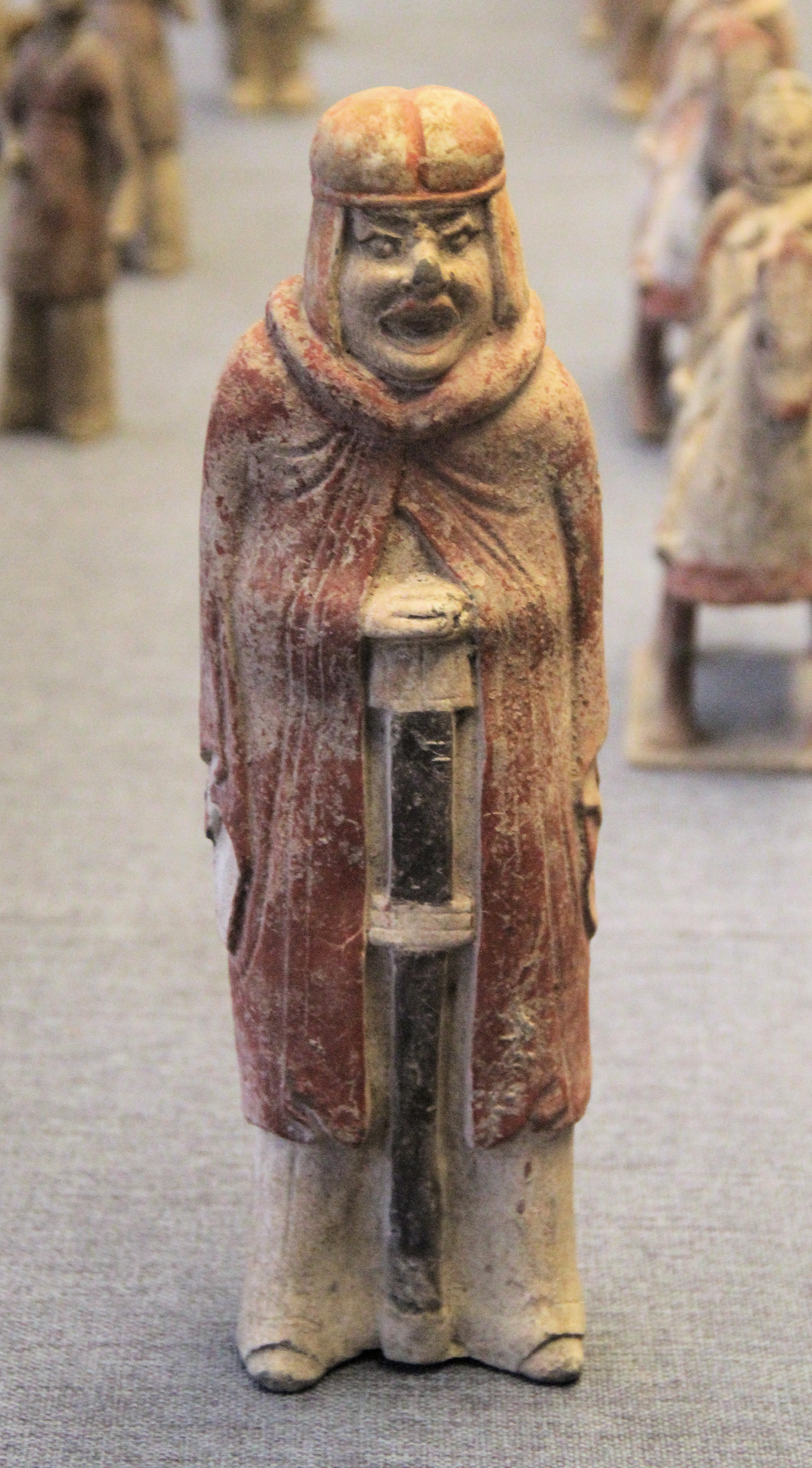
A Northern Wei officer. Tomb statuette, Luoyang Museum.

The Tuoba (Chinese) or Tabgatch (Old Turkic: 𐱃𐰉𐰍𐰲, Tabγač), also known by other names, was an influential Xianbei clan in early imperial China. During the Sixteen Kingdoms after the fall of Han and the Three Kingdoms, the Tuoba established and ruled the Dai state in northern China. The dynasty ruled from 310 to 376 and was restored in 386. The same year, the dynasty was renamed Wei, later distinguished in Chinese historiography as the Northern Wei. This powerful state gained control of most of northern China, supporting Buddhism while increasingly sinicizing. As part of this process, in 496, the Emperor Xiaowen changed the imperial clan's surname from Tuoba to Yuan (元). The empire split into Eastern Wei and Western Wei in 535, with the Western Wei's rulers briefly resuming use of the Tuoba name in 554.

A branch of the Tanguts also bore a surname transcribed as Tuoba before their chieftains were given the Chinese surnames Li (李) and Zhao (趙) by the Tang and Song dynasties respectively. Some of these Tangut Tuobas later adopted the surname Weiming (嵬名), with this branch eventually establishing and ruling the Western Xia in northwestern China from 1038 to 1227.

== Names ==
Tuoba is the atonal pinyin romanization of the Mandarin pronunciation of the Chinese 拓跋 (Tuòbá), whose pronunciation at the time of its transcription into Middle Chinese has been reconstructed as *Thak-bat. The same name also appears with the first character transcribed as 托 or 㩉 and with the second character transcribed as 拔; it has also been anglicized as T'o-pa and as Toba. The name is also attested as Tufa (禿髮, Tūfà or Tūfǎ), whose Middle Chinese pronunciation has been reconstructed as *T'ak-bwat, or *T'ak-buat. The name is also sometimes clarified as the Tuoba Xianbei (拓跋鮮卑, Tuòbá Xiānbēi).

In the 8th century, the Old Turkic name Tabγač (𐱃𐰉𐰍𐰲), usually anglicized as Tabgatch or Tabgach, was used in reference to the Tang dynasty. This name is now widely believed to derive from "Tuoba". However Charles Holcombe notes that it is still a hypothetical derivation and the Turkic pronunciation is likely not how it was pronounced by the Tuoba. The name appears in other Central Asian accounts as Tabghāj and Taugash and in Byzantine Greek sources like Theophylact Simocatta's History as Taugas (Ancient Greek: Ταυγάς) and Taugast (Ταυγάστ). Zhang Xushan and others have argued for the name's ultimate derivation from a transcription into Turkic languages of the Chinese name "Great Han" (大漢, s 大汉, Dà Hàn, MC *Dàj Xàn).

A reconstruction of the native pronunciation of Tuoba is Taġbač.

== History ==
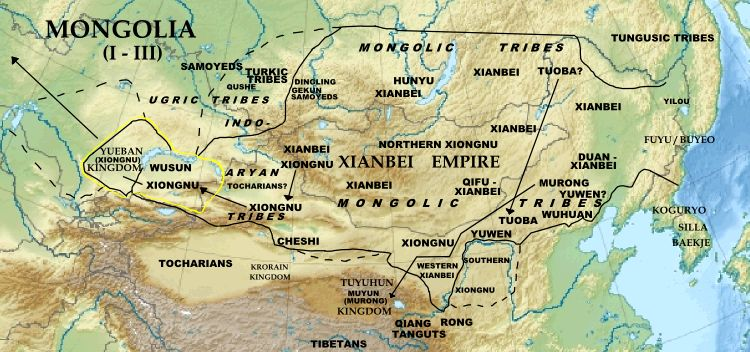
Tuoba people and their neighbours, c. III century AD

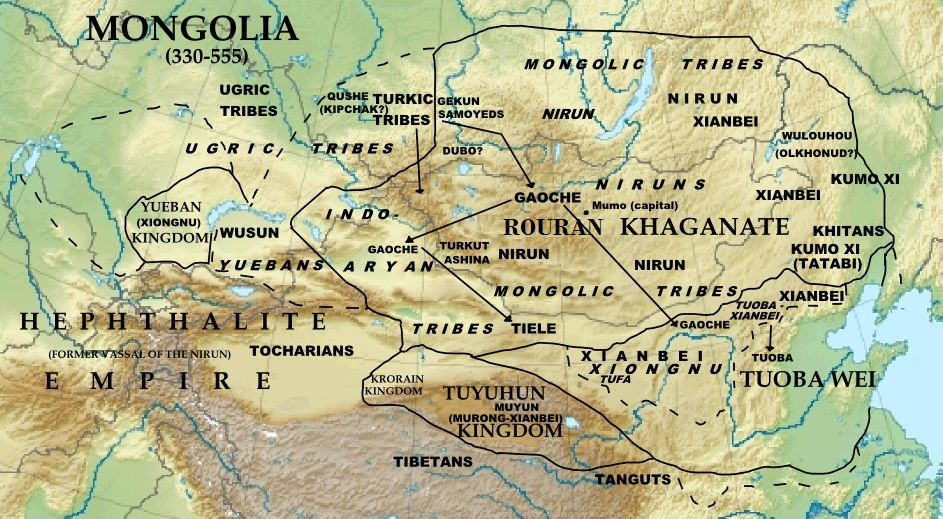
Rouran Khaganate, Tuyuhun Kingdom, Tuoba Wei 330–555 AD

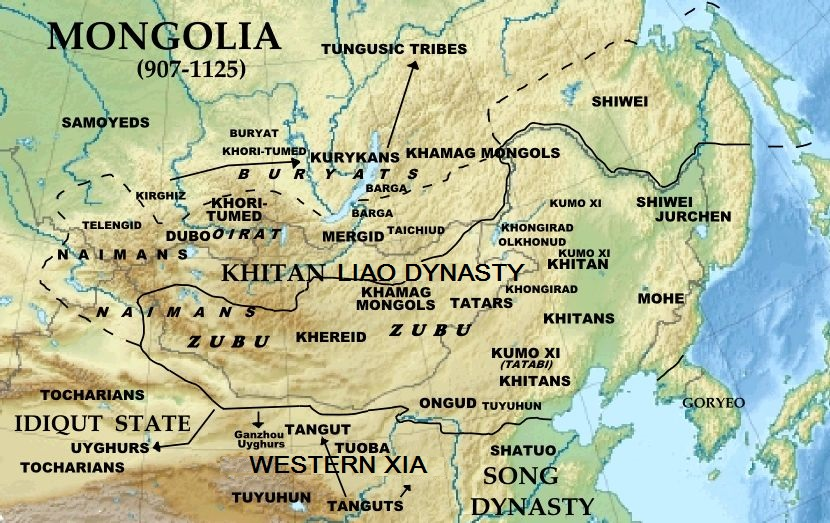
Remnants of Tuoba in Alxa League

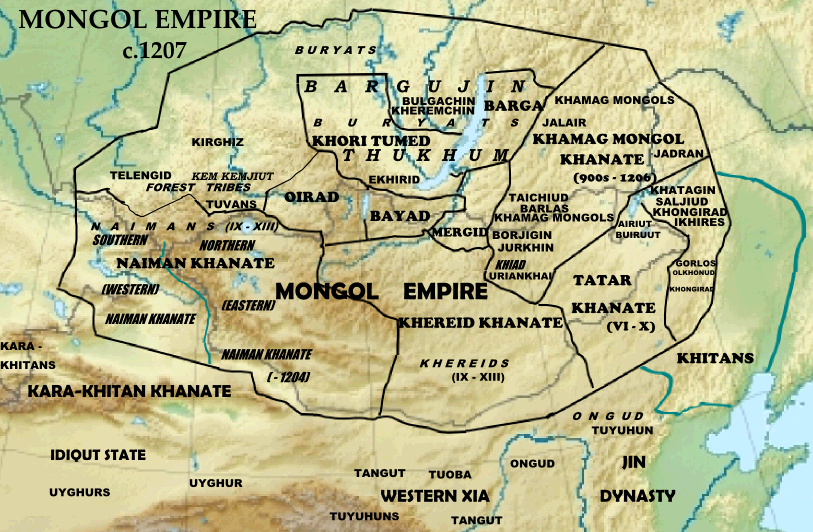
Remnants of Tuoba in Alxa League

The Tuoba were a Xianbei clan. The distribution of the Xianbei people ranged from present day Northeast China to Mongolia, and the Tuoba were one of the largest clans among the western Xianbei, ranging from present day Shanxi province and westward and northwestward. They established the state of Dai from 310 to 376 AD and ruled as the Northern Wei from 386 to 536. The Tuoba states of Dai and Northern Wei also claimed to possess the quality of earth in the Chinese Wu Xing theory. All the chieftains of the Tuoba were revered as emperors in the Book of Wei and the History of the Northern Dynasties. A branch of the Tuoba in the west known as the Tufa also ruled the Southern Liang dynasty from 397 to 414 during the Sixteen Kingdoms period.

The Northern Wei started to arrange for Chinese elites to marry daughters of the Xianbei Tuoba royal family in the 480s. More than fifty percent of Tuoba Xianbei princesses of the Northern Wei were married to southern Chinese men from the imperial families and aristocrats from southern China of the Southern dynasties who defected and moved north to join the Northern Wei. Some Chinese exiled royalty fled from southern China and defected to the Xianbei. Several daughters of the Xianbei Tuoba Emperor Xiaowen of Northern Wei were married to Chinese elites: the Han Chinese Liu Song royal Liu Hui married Princess Lanling of the Northern Wei; Princess Huayang married Sima Fei, a descendant of Jin dynasty (266–420) royalty; Princess Jinan married Lu Daoqian; and Princess Nanyang married Xiao Baoyin (萧宝夤), a member of Southern Qi royalty. Emperor Xiaozhuang of Northern Wei's sister the Shouyang Princess was wedded to Emperor Wu of Liang's son Xiao Zong. One of Emperor Xiaowu of Northern Wei's sisters was married to Zhang Huan, a Han Chinese, according to the Book of Zhou. His name is given as Zhang Xin in the Book of Northern Qi and History of the Northern Dynasties which mention his marriage to a Xianbei princess of Wei. His personal name was changed due to a naming taboo on the emperor's name. He was the son of Zhang Qiong.

When the Eastern Jin dynasty ended, Northern Wei received the Han Chinese Jin prince Sima Chuzhi as a refugee. A Northern Wei Princess married Sima Chuzhi, giving birth to Sima Jinlong (司馬金龍). Northern Liang Xiongnu King Juqu Mujian's daughter married Sima Jinlong.

== Culture ==
=== Ethnicity ===
According to Hyacinth (Bichurin), an early 19th-century scholar, the Tuoba and their Rouran enemies descended from common ancestors. He also considered the Xiongnu and Xianbei to be two subgroups (or dynasties) of but one same ethnicity.

According to the Book of Wei, both the Rouran and the Xianbei originated from the Donghu people and the Tuoba originated from the Xianbei while the Book of Song and Book of Liang connected Rourans to the earlier Xiongnu. Edwin G. Pulleyblank states that the Donghu ancestors of the Tuoba and Rouran were most likely proto-Mongols.

The Xianbei were probably not a single ethnicity, but rather a multilingual, multi-ethnic confederation. Some scholars like Gerard Clauson (1960) saw the Xianbei and Tuoba as Turks or even Bulghar Turks, with the implication that the entire layer of early Turkic borrowings in Mongolic came from the Xianbei rather than from the Xiongnu. Peter B. Golden postulates that the Pre-Proto-Mongolic speakers may have been the largest constituent of the Xianbei confederation, but it also included former Xiongnu subjects who spoke other languages, Turkic being one of them. According to Joo-Yup Lee nomadic confederations were often made up of tribes of diverse linguistic backgrounds. For instance, the ruling elite of the Tuoba Wei dynasty (386–534CE) was made up of both Turkic and Mongolic groups. While migrating southward to northern China from their original abode in northeastern Mongolia, the Para-Mongolic Tuoba assimilated several Turkic Dingling (Tiele) tribes such as the Hegu (Qirghiz) and Yizhan. As a result, the Dingling elements constituted as much as a quarter of the Tuoba tribe.

=== Language ===
There is no consensus on the classification of the Tuoba language and it has been identified as either a Mongolic language or a Turkic language. No Tuoba texts have survived and the only sources for the Tuoba language are glosses scattered in Chinese texts. According to the Book of the Later Han, "the language and culture of the Xianbei are the same as the Wuhuan".

With the exception of Shiratori Kurakichi (1912, 1913), who was the first to claim Tuoba as a Mongolian language, most scholars during the first half of the 20th century such as Peter A. Boodberg, Louis Bazin, Gerard Clauson, René Grousset, Paul Pelliot and Wolfram Eberhard believed that the Tuoba people and language were primarily Turkic with perhaps some Mongolic admixture. This lasted until the 1970s when Lajos Ligeti argued that both the Xianbei and Tuoba languages were actually Mongolic due to the existence of obvious Mongolic cognates. Pulleyblank was favorable to Ligeti's argument and concluded in 1983 that the classification was sound while noting that there were probably Turkic and non-Mongolian elements integrated into the Tuoba confederacy. This was followed by another agreement from Gerhard Doerfer in 1992.

In 1996, Juha Janhunen proposed that the Tuoba might have spoken an Oghur Turkic language. However in 2003, Janhunen and Claus Schönig both came to the conclusion that the Tuoba language was Mongolic and its identification as Turkic was incorrect. Janhunen says that this mistake was partly caused by the existence of Turkic names and titles, but these were widespread cultural words in Central and East Asia. Schönig states that due to advances in research on Khitan language, the Mongolic or Para-Mongolic identity of the Xianbei and Tuoba was becoming more evident. Schönig points out that the first identifiable layer of Mongolic loanwords entering Turkic languages is dated to the Xianbei period when the linguistic flow of Turkic into Mongolic was at least partly reversed.

In 2005, Chen Sanping used new evidence from Tuoba onomastic data to argue that the core Tuoba clans likely spoke a Turkic language. Chen's argument for a Turkic Tuoba language has received pushback from a number of scholars including Alexander Vovin, Stephen G. Haw, and Chen Hao. Vovin criticized Chen for his lack of examples and blamed him for reviving the idea that the Tuoba language was Turkic. Vovin used new reconstructions of Early middle Chinese to study the Tuoba language and found that it shared unique similarities to the Manchu language such as the initial consonant m- that does not exist in Turkic languages. In 2012, Chen expanded on his argument by reiterating the onomastic data and separating the Tuoba into core clans that were Turkic and non-core clans that were Mongolic. However, a review of Chen's 2012 work by Haw found his new argument for a Turkic Tuoba language to be unconvincing. In 2020, Chen Hao also voiced opposition to Chen Sanping's argument for a Turkic Tuoba language.

Other more recent works by An-King Lim (2016, 2023) classifies Tuoba as a Turkic language, while Andrew Shimunek (2017) classifies Tuoba as a "Serbi" (i.e., para-Mongolic) language. Shimunek's Serbi branch also consists of the Tuyuhun and Khitan languages. In 2022, Holcombe stated that the scholarly opinion has shifted in favor of the Tuoba language as Mongolic.

A number of Chinese authors such as Zhu Xueyuan (2000), Wuqilatu (2002), and Luo Xin (2009) regard the Xianbei language as Mongolic or proto-Mongolic. Liu Xueyao argues that the Tuoba may have had their own language that was only broadly Ural-Atalic and should not be assumed to be identical with any other known languages.

== Genetics ==
According to Zhou (2006) the haplogroup frequencies of the Tuoba Xianbei were 43.75% haplogroup D, 31.25% haplogroup C, 12.5% haplogroup B, 6.25% haplogroup A and 6.25% "other." The results display typical genetic characteristics from Northeastern Asia, particularly closer in proximity to the Oroqen people, Mongolians, and Evenki people.

Zhou (2014) obtained mitochondrial DNA analysis from 17 Tuoba Xianbei, which indicated that these specimens were, similarly, completely East Asian in their maternal origins, belonging to haplogroups D, C, B, A and haplogroup G. The report shows limited local admixture during the southward Xianbei migration and greater admixture after settling in northern China.

== Chieftains of Tuoba Clan 219–376 (as Princes of Dai 315–376) ==
Posthumous name	Full name	Period of reign	Other
神元 Shényuán	拓拔力微 Tuòbá Lìwéi	219–277	Temple name: 始祖 Shízǔ
章 Zhāng	拓拔悉鹿 Tuòbá Xīlù	277–286	
平 Píng	拓拔綽 Tuòbá Chuò	286–293	
思 Sī	拓拔弗 Tuòbá Fú	293–294	
昭 Zhāo	拓拔祿官 Tuòbá Lùguān	294–307	
桓 Huán	拓拔猗㐌 Tuòbá Yītuō	295–305	
穆 Mù	拓拔猗盧 Tuòbá Yīlú	295–316	
None	拓拔普根 Tuòbá Pǔgēn	316	
None	拓拔 Tuòbá	316	
平文 Píngwén	拓跋鬱律 Tuòbá Yùlǜ	316–321	
惠 Huì	拓拔賀傉 Tuòbá Hèrǔ	321–325	
煬 Yáng	拓拔紇那 Tuòbá Hénǎ	325–329 and 335–337	
烈 Liè	拓拔翳槐 Tuòbá Yìhuaí	329–335 and 337–338	
昭成 Zhaōchéng	拓拔什翼健 Tuòbá Shíyìqiàn	338–376	Regnal name: 建國 Jiànguó

== Legacy ==
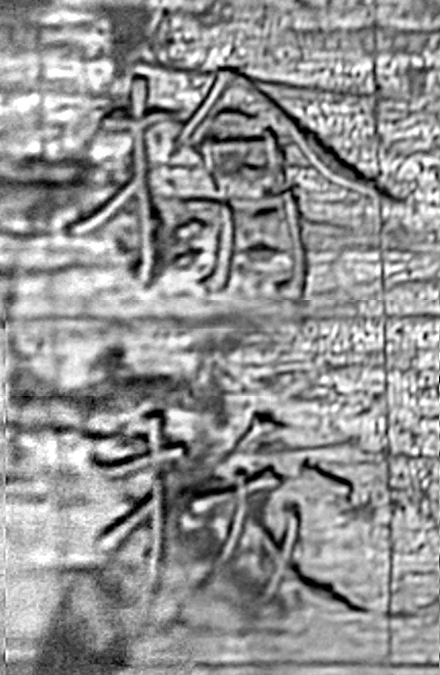
The name "Tuoba" (㩉拔) in the epitaph of Li Xian (Northern Zhou general) (569 CE).

As a consequence of the Northern Wei's extensive contacts with Central Asia, Turkic sources identified Tabgach, also transcribed as Tawjach, Tawġač, Tamghaj, Tamghach, Tafgaj, and Tabghaj, as the ruler or country of China until the 13th century.

The Orkhon inscriptions in the Orkhon Valley in modern-day Mongolia from the 8th century identify Tabgach as China.

I myself, wise Tonyukuk, lived in Tabgach country. (As the whole) Turkic people was under Tabgach subjection.

In the 11th century text, the Dīwān Lughāt al-Turk ("Compendium of the languages of the Turks"), Turkic scholar Mahmud al-Kashgari, writing in Baghdad for an Arabic audience, describes Tawjach as one of the three components comprising China.

Ṣīn [i.e., China] is originally three fold: Upper, in the east which is called Tawjāch; middle which is Khitāy, lower which is Barkhān in the vicinity of Kashgar. But now Tawjāch is known as Maṣīn and Khitai as Ṣīn.

At the time of his writing, China's northern fringe was ruled by Khitan-led Liao dynasty while the remainder of China proper was ruled by the Northern Song dynasty. Arab sources used Sīn to refer to northern China and Māsīn to represent southern China. In his account, al-Kashgari refers to his homeland, around Kashgar, then part of the Kara-Khanid Khanate, as Lower China. The rulers of the Karakanids adopted Tamghaj Khan (Turkic: the Khan of China) in their title, and minted coins bearing this title. Much of the realm of the Karakhanids including Transoxania and the western Tarim Basin had been under the rule of the Tang dynasty prior to the Battle of Talas in 751, and the Karakhanids continued to identify with China, several centuries later.

The Tabgatch name for the political entity has also been translated into Chinese as Taohuashi (Chinese: 桃花石; pinyin: táohuā shí). This name has been used in China in recent years to promote ethnic unity.

== See also ==
- Chinese sovereign
- Ethnic groups in Chinese history
- History of China
- Jin dynasty (266–420)
- Khitan people
