= Tuoba Yituo =

Tuoba Yituo (Chinese: 拓跋猗㐌; pinyin: Tuòbá Yītuō) (died 305) was the chieftain of the central Tuoba territory from 295 to 305. He is the son of Tuoba Shamohan (拓跋沙漠汗) and his brothers included Tuoba Yilu and Tuoba Fu.

In 295, Tuoba Luguan the chieftain of the Tuoba (a branch of the Xianbei) divided the territory under Tuoba control into three areas: a vast tract of land extending west from White Mountain (northeast of Zhangjiakou), to Dai (Datong, Shanxi); an area from Shengle (south of Hohhot) and beyond; a central area, which included north Shanxi and the region to its north. Tuoba Yituo was named chieftain of the central area. As chieftain of the central Tuoba territory, Tuoba Yituo in 297 passed through Outer Mongolia and conquered 30 territories and gained the support of various ethnically Han people, in addition to his own Xianbei people. Tuoba Yituo is said to have rescued Sima Teng, governor of the Jin province of Bing, from the Xiongnu. In 304, Tuoba Yituo, along with Tuoba Yilu, joined forces with the Jin armies and defeated the Han-Zhao leader Liu Yuan. In 305, Tuoba Yituo died, and was succeeded by his son Tuoba Pugen as chieftain of the central Tuoba territory.
