= Tuoba Yilu =

Tuoba Yilu 拓跋猗盧
- Prince of Dai

Ruler of Dai
- Reign: 310–316
- Successor: Tuoba Pugen
- Died: 316
Full name
- Family name: Tuòbá (拓跋); Given name: Yīlú (猗盧)
Regnal name
- 310–315: Duke of Dai (代公); 315–316: Prince of Dai (代王)
Posthumous name
- Emperor Mu (穆皇帝, honored by Northern Wei)
- Dynasty: Dai

Tuoba Yilu (Chinese: 拓跋猗盧; pinyin: Tuòbá Yīlú; died 316) was the chieftain of the western Tuoba territory from 295 to 307, supreme chieftain of the Tuoba from 307 to 316, Duke of Dai from 310 to 315, and first ruler of the Dai kingdom from 315 to 316. He was the son of Tuoba Shamohan (拓跋沙漠汗) and his brothers included Tuoba Yituo and Tuoba Fu.

In 295, Tuoba Luguan, the chieftain of the Tuoba (a branch of the Xianbei), divided the territory under Tuoba control into three areas: a vast tract of land extending west from White Mountain (northeast of Zhangjiakou), to Dai (Datong, Shanxi); an area from Shengle (south of Hohhot) and beyond; and a central area, which included north Shanxi and the region to its north. Tuoba Yilu would be named chieftain of the western area. As chieftain of the western Tuoba territory, Tuoba Yilu defeated the Xiongnu and Wuhuan to the west, gaining in this way the support of various ethnically Han and Wuhuan people, in addition to his own Xianbei people. In 304, Tuoba Yilu, along with Tuoba Yituo, joined forces with the Jin armies and defeated Liu Yuan. In 305, Tuoba Yituo died, and in 307, Tuoba Luguan died, following which Tuoba Yilu became the supreme chieftain of the Tuoba.

The name Dai itself originated when Tuoba Yilu was made Duke of Dai (代公) and given five commanderies by the Western Jin in 310 as a reward for his helping Liu Kun (劉琨), the Governor of Bingzhou (并州) (modern Shanxi province), to fight the Xiongnu Han state. This fief was later raised from a duchy to a principality by the Western Jin court in 315. In 312, Tuoba Yilu assisted Liu Kun in the recapturing of Jinyang (晉陽, in modern Taiyuan, Shanxi) from the Han general Liu Yao. When Tuoba Yilu designated his youngest son Tuoba Biyan (拓跋比延) as his heir apparent instead of his eldest son Tuoba Liuxiu (拓跋六修), this led to a dispute between him and his son Tuoba Liuxiu. He was succeeded by Tuoba Pugen in 316, after his own son Tuoba Liuxiu killed him a succession dispute.

Emperor Mu of Dai House of Tuoba Died: 316
Chinese royalty
Preceded by Himself as Duke of Dai	Prince of Dai; 315–316	Succeeded by Tuoba Pugen
Chinese nobility
Recreated Last known title holder: Liu Lang as Prince of Dai	Duke of Dai; 310–315	Succeeded by Himself as Prince of Dai
