= List of people of the Three Kingdoms (S) =

The following is a partial list of people significant to the Three Kingdoms period (220–280) of Chinese history. Their romanised names start with the letter S.

== S ==
Name	Courtesy name	Birth year	Death year	Ancestral home (present-day location)	Role	Allegiance	Previous allegiance(s)	Notes
Sang Fu 桑馥				Henanyin (Luoyang, Henan)	Musician	Cao Wei		
Shamohan 沙末汗					Tribal leader	Xianbei		
Shamoke 沙摩柯			222	Wuling (in Changde, Hunan)	Tribal leader			
Shan Bolong 單伯龍				Shanyang (Jinxiang County, Shandong)				
Shan Fu 單甫					Politician	Han dynasty		
Shan Gu 單固	Gongxia 恭夏		251	Shanyang County (Jinxiang County, Shandong)	Politician	Cao Wei		
Shan Jing 單經					General	Gongsun Zan		
Shan Tao 山濤	Juyuan 巨源	205	283	Henei (Southwest of Wuzhi County, Henan)	Politician	Jin dynasty	Cao Wei	Jin Shu vol. 43.
Shan Yang 單颺	Wuxuan 武宣			Shanyang, Hulu (Yutai County, Shandong)	Politician	Han dynasty		
Shan Yao 山曜				Henei (Southwest of Wuzhi County, Henan)	Politician	Cao Wei		
Shan Zichun 單子春					Politician	Cao Wei		
Shan Zidao 山子道				Fengyi (Dali County, Shaanxi)	Weiqi player	Han dynasty		
Shang Guang 尚廣					Diviner	Eastern Wu		
Shang Hong 尚弘					General	Han dynasty		
Shang Sheng 商升					General	Han dynasty		
Shang Yao 商曜				Taiyuan County (Taiyuan, Shanxi)	General	Han dynasty		
Shangguan Chong 上官崇				Hedong (Xia County, Shanxi)	Politician	Cao Wei		
Shangguan Yong 上官雝					General	Shu Han		
Shangguan Zixiu 上官子脩					Politician	Cao Wei		
Shaoge 燒戈					General	Qiang		
Shao Chou 邵疇	Wenbo 溫伯	235	274	Kuaiji (Shaoxing, Zhejiang)	General	Eastern Wu		
Shao Deng 邵登				Henanyin (Luoyang, Henan)	Musician	Cao Wei		
Shao Mao 邵瑁					Politician	Cao Wei		
Shao Nan 邵南					General	Eastern Wu		
Shao Ti 邵悌	Yuanbo 元伯			Yangping	Politician	Cao Wei		
She Ci 射慈					Politician	Eastern Wu		
She Jian 射堅	Wengu 文固			Fufeng (Xingping, Shaanxi)	Politician	Shu Han	Han dynasty, Liu Zhang	
She Yuan 射援	Wenxiong 文雄			Fufeng (Xingping, Shaanxi)	Politician	Shu Han	Han dynasty, Liu Zhang	
Shen Cheng 沈成				Runan (Pingyu County, Henan)	Rebel leader			
Shen Dan 申耽	Yiju 義舉			Shangyong	General	Cao Wei	Shu Han	
Shen De 審德			226		General	Sun Quan		
Shen Gu 審固				Henai (Wuzhi County, Henan)	General	Cao Wei		
Shen Heng 沈珩	Zhongshan 仲山			Wu County (Suzhou, Jiangsu)	Politician	Eastern Wu		
Shen Mi 沈彌					Rebel leader		Liu Zhang	
Shen Pei 審配	Zhengnan 正南		204	Yin'an, Wei	Advisor	Yuan Shang	Yuan Shao	
Shen Rong 審榮					General	Cao Cao	Yuan Shao, Yuan Shang	
Shen Yi 申儀				Shangyong	General	Cao Wei	Shu Han	
Shen Ying 沈瑩			280		General	Eastern Wu		
Shen You 沈友	Zizheng 子正	176	204	Wu County (Suzhou, Jiangsu)	Advisor	Sun Quan		
Sheng Bo 盛勃					General	Shu Han		
Sheng Chong 盛冲					Scholar, politician	Eastern Wu		
Sheng Dao 盛道				Qianwei (Qianwei, Sichuan)	Rebel leader			
Sheng Kuang 盛匡				Zizhong County(Shaoxing, Zhejiang)	Politician	Cao Wei		
Sheng Man 盛曼					General	Eastern Wu		
Sheng Xian 盛憲	Xiaozhang 孝章			Kuaiji (Shaoxing, Zhejiang)	Politician	Han dynasty		
Shen Xian 盛暹				Wu County (Suzhou, Jiangsu)		Eastern Wu		
Sheng Xiang 盛翔				Qianwei (Qianwei, Sichuan)				
Shentu Pan 申屠蟠	Zilong 子龍			Waihuang, Chenliu (Minquan County, Henan)	Scholar			Houhanshu vol. 53.
Empress Shenyuan 神元皇后			248		Empress	Xianbei		
Shi A 史阿				Henanyin (Luoyang, Henan)		Han dynasty		
Shi Bao 石苞	Zhongrong 仲容		273	Nanpi, Bohai (Northeast of Nanpi County, Hebei)	General, politician	Jin dynasty	Cao Wei	Jin Shu vol. 33.
Shi Chong 石崇	Jilun 季倫	249	300	Nanpi, Bohai (Northeast of Nanpi County, Hebei)	General, politician	Jin dynasty		
Shi Dan 施但					Rebel leader			
Shi Delin 石德林				Anding (Zhenyuan, Gansu)	Scholar	Han dynasty		
Shi Gan 士幹				Guangxin, Cangwu (Cangwu County, Guangxi)	Politician	Eastern Wu	Shi Xie	
Shi Gan 石幹					Politician	Eastern Wu		
Shi He 史郃					Politician	Cao Wei	Shu Han	
Shi Huan 史渙	Gongliu 公劉		209	Pei (Suixi County, Anhui)	General	Cao Cao		
Shi Huang 史璜					Politician	Han dynasty		
Shi Hu 石虎					Politician	Cao Wei		
Shi Hui 士徽		165	227	Guangxin, Cangwu (Cangwu County, Guangxi)	General	Sun Quan	Shi Xie	
Shi Ji 施績	Gongxu 公緒		270	Guzhang, Danyang (Anji County, Zhejiang)	General	Eastern Wu		a.k.a. Zhu Ji Sanguozhi vol. 56.
Shi Jian 石建					General	Cao Wei		
Shi Jing 史靜				Pei (Suixi County, Anhui)		Cao Wei		
Shi Kuan 施寬					General	Eastern Wu		
Shi Kuang 士匡		175		Guangxin, Cangwu (Cangwu County, Guangxi)	General	Eastern Wu	Shi Xie	
Shi Liang 師亮				Anding (Zhenyuan, Gansu)	Politician	Cao Wei		
Shi Lu 史路						Han dynasty		
Shi Miao 時苗	Dezhou 德胄			Julu (Pingxiang County, Hebei)	General	Han dynasty		
Shi Ming 施明					General	Eastern Wu		
Shi Ren 士仁	Junyi 君義			Guangyang (Southwest of Daxing District, Beijing)	General	Sun Quan	Shu Han	Fu Shiren (傅士仁) in novel.
Shi Shuo 施朔					General	Eastern Wu		
Shi Song 士頌				Guangxin, Cangwu (Cangwu County, Guangxi)	Politician	Eastern Wu	Shi Xie	
Shi Tao 石韜	Guangyuan 廣元			Yingchuan (Yuzhou City, Henan)	Politician	Cao Wei		
Shi Wei 石偉	Gongcao 公操	208	290	Jingzhou, Nan County (Jingzhou, Hubei)	Politician	Eastern Wu		
Shi Wei / Si Wei 史偉/斯偉		196	265		Politician	Eastern Wu		
Shi Wei 施畏				Danyang County (Xuancheng, Anhui)	Politician	Cao Wei		
Shi Wei 士䵋				Guangxin, Cangwu (Cangwu County, Guangxi)	Politician	Eastern Wu	Shi Xie	
Shi Weize 石威則						Cao Wei		
Shi Wu 士武				Guangxin, Cangwu (Cangwu County, Guangxi)	Politician	Eastern Wu	Shi Xie	
Shi Xie 士燮	Weiyan 威彥	137	226	Guangxin, Cangwu (Cangwu County, Guangxi)	Warlord	Shi Xie	Han dynasty	Sanguozhi vol. 49.
Shi Xin 士廞				Guangxin, Cangwu (Cangwu County, Guangxi)	Politician	Eastern Wu	Shi Xie	
Shi Yi 是儀	Ziyu 子羽			Yingling, Beihai (South of Weifang, Shandong)	Politician	Eastern Wu	Kong Rong, Liu Yao	Sanguozhi vol. 62.
Shi Yi 士壹		153		Guangxin, Cangwu (Cangwu County, Guangxi)	Politician	Eastern Wu	Han dynasty, Shi Xie	
Shi Yiguan 師宜官					Calligrapher	Yuan Shu	Han dynasty	
Shi Zheng 施正					General	Eastern Wu		
Shi Zhi 士祗		163	227	Guangxin, Cangwu (Cangwu County, Guangxi)		Sun Quan	Shi Xie	
Shi Zhouhezhu 石周曷朱	Qiyijia 乞翼加			Wuxiang (Wuxiang County, Shanxi)	Tribal leader	Jie		
Shi Zimiao 史子眇					Taoist	Han dynasty		
Shi Zuan 師纂			263		General	Cao Wei		
Shisun Meng 士孫萌	Wenshi 文始			Fufeng (Xingping, Shaanxi)	Politician	Han dynasty		
Shisun Rui 士孫瑞	Junrong 君榮	129	195	Fufeng (Xingping, Shaanxi)	Politician	Li Jue	Han dynasty, Dong Zhuo	
Shou Liang 壽良	Wenshu 文淑			Chengdu, Shu (Chengdu, Sichuan)	Politician	Jin dynasty	Shu Han, Cao Wei	Huayang Guo Zhi vol. 11. 13.
Shu Boying 舒伯膺				Chenliu County (Kaifeng, Henan)				
Shu Shao 舒邵	Zhongying 仲膺			Chenliu County (Kaifeng, Henan)	General	Yuan Shu		
Shu Xie 舒燮				Chenliu County (Kaifeng, Henan)	Politician	Eastern Wu		
Si Cong 斯從				Wuning (Jinhua, Zhejiang)	Politician	Eastern Wu		
Si Dun 斯敦	Youzhi 友直	226	304	Wuning (Jinhua, Zhejiang)		Eastern Wu		
Si Fan 司蕃					General	Cao Wei		
Si Li 司隸					Rebel leader	Yellow Turban rebels		
Sima Fang 司馬防	Jiangong 建公	149	219	Wen County, Henei (Wen County, Henan)	Politician	Han dynasty		
Sima Fu 司馬孚	Shuda 叔達	180	272	Wen County, Henei (Wen County, Henan)	Politician	Cao Wei	Han dynasty	
Sima Hui 司馬徽	Decao 德操	147	208	Yingchuan (Yuzhou City, Henan)	Scholar			
Sima Jin 司馬進	Huida 惠達			Xiaojing, Wen County, Henei (Zhaoxian Town, Wen County, Henan)	Politician	Cao Wei		
Sima Ju 司馬俱					Rebel leader	Yellow Turban rebels		
Sima Lang 司馬朗	Boda 伯達	171	217	Wen County, Henei (Wen County, Henan)	Politician	Han dynasty		Sanguozhi vol. 15.
Sima Liang 司馬亮	Ziyi 子翼		291	Wen County, Henei (Wen County, Henan)	Warlord, noble, general, politician	Jin dynasty	Cao Wei	
Sima Lun 司馬倫	Ziyi 子彝		301	Wen County, Henei (Wen County, Henan)	Warlord, noble, general, politician	Jin dynasty	Cao Wei	
Sima Min 司馬敏	Youda 幼達			Xiaojing, Wen County, Henei (Zhaoxian Town, Wen County, Henan)	politician	Cao Wei		
Sima Qi 司馬岐				Wen County, Henei (Wen County, Henan)	Politician	Cao Wei		
Sima Shengzhi 司馬勝之	Xingxian 興先			Mianzhu (Mianzhu, Sichuan)	Politician	Jin dynasty	Shu Han, Cao Wei	Huayang Guo Zhi vol. 11. 04.
Sima Shi 司馬師	Ziyuan 子元	208	255	Wen County, Henei (Wen County, Henan)	General, politician, regent	Cao Wei		Jin Shu vol. 2.
Sima Tong 司馬通	Yada 雅達			Xiaojing, Wen County, Henei (Zhaoxian Town, Wen County, Henan)	politician	Cao Wei		
Sima Wang 司馬望	Zichu 子初	205	271	Wen County, Henei (Wen County, Henan)	General, politician	Jin dynasty	Cao Wei	
Sima Xu 司馬旭	Jida 季達			Xiaojing, Wen County, Henei (Zhaoxian Town, Wen County, Henan)	politician	Cao Wei		
Sima Xun 司馬恂	Xianda 顯達			Xiaojing, Wen County, Henei (Zhaoxian Town, Wen County, Henan)	politician	Cao Wei		
Sima Yan 司馬炎	Anshi 安世	236	290	Wen County, Henei (Wen County, Henan)	Emperor	Jin dynasty	Cao Wei	Jin Shu vol. 3.
Sima Yi 司馬懿	Zhongda 仲達	179	251	Xiaojing, Wen County, Henei (Zhaoxian Town, Wen County, Henan)	General, politician, regent	Cao Wei		See Family tree of Sima Yi Jin Shu vol. 1.
Sima You 司馬攸	Dayou 大猷	248	283	Wen County, Henei (Wen County, Henan)	Politician	Jin dynasty	Cao Wei	Jin Shu vol. 38.
Sima Zhao 司馬昭	Zishang 子上	211	265	Wen County, Henei (Wen County, Henan)	General, politician, regent	Cao Wei		Jin Shu vol. 2.
Sima Zhao 司馬肇				Wen County, Henei (Wen County, Henan)	Politician	Jin dynasty		
Sima Zhi 司馬芝	Zihua 子華			Wen County, Henei (Wen County, Henan)	Politician	Cao Wei	Han dynasty	Sanguozhi vol. 12.
Sima Zhou 司馬伷	Zijiang 子将	227	283	Wen County, Henei (Wen County, Henan)	General, politician	Jin dynasty	Cao Wei	Jin Shu vol. 38.
Song Dian 宋典			189		Eunuch	Han dynasty		
Song Ding 宋定					General	Sun Quan	Han dynasty	
Song Guo 宋果					General	Li Jue	Han dynasty	
Song Hao 宋豪					General	Eastern Wu	Cao Cao	
Song Jian 宋建			214	Longxi (Lintao County, Gansu)	General, warlord, rebel leader	Song Jian		Sometimes referenced as Song Yang (宋揚).
Song Jie 宋階						Han dynasty		
Song Jin 宋金					General	Cao Wei		
Song Qi 宋奇					Politician	Han dynasty		
Song Qian 宋謙					General	Sun Quan		
Song Quan 宋權					Politician	Cao Wei		
Song Shou 宋壽					Diviner			
Song Wei 宋瑋					Politician	Shu Han		
Song Xian 宋憲					General	Cao Cao	Lü Bu	
Song Yi 宋翼					Calligrapher	Cao Wei		
Song Yuan 宋遠	Wenqi 文奇				Officer	Shu Han		
Song Zhong 宋忠	Zhongzi 仲子			Nanyang (Nanyang, Henan)	Politician	Cao Wei	Liu Biao, Han dynasty	
Su Bo 蘇伯					Rebel leader, general		Cao Cao	
Su Dai 蘇代				Wu County, Wu (Suzhou, Jiangsu)	Warlord, Politician	Han dynasty		
Su Gu 蘇固					Politician	Han dynasty		
Su Fei 蘇飛					General	Huang Zu		
Su Fei 蘇非					General	Shu Han		
Su Heng 蘇衡				Jiuquan (Jiuquan, Gansu)	General, rebel leader	Cao Wei		
Su Lin 蘇林	Xiaoyou 孝友			Chenliu County (Kaifeng, Henan)	Politician	Cao Wei		
Su Ma 蘇馬					General	Han dynasty		
Su Shang 蘇尚			233		General	Cao Wei		
Su Shu 宿舒					General	Gongsun Yuan		
Su Shuang 蘇雙				Zhongshanguo (Dingzhou, Hebei)	Merchant			
Su Shuo 蘇鑠			254		Politician	Cao Wei		
Su Yi 蘇怡				Wugong, Fufeng (Wugong County, Shaanxi)	Politician	Cao Wei		
Su You 蘇由					General	Cao Cao	Yuan Shang	
Su Yu 蘇愉	Xiuyu 休豫			Wugong, Fufeng (Wugong County, Shaanxi)	Politician	Cao Wei		
Su Yue 蘇越						Cao Wei		
Su Ze 蘇則	Wenshi 文師		223	Wugong, Fufeng (Wugong County, Shaanxi)	Politician	Cao Wei		Sanguozhi vol. 16.
Sui Chun 隨春					General	Eastern Wu		
Sui Gu 眭固	Baitu 白兔		199		Bandit leader	Yuan Shao	Black Mountain bandits, Zhang Yang	
Sui Yuanjin 眭元進			200		General	Yuan Shao		
Suli 素利			228		Tribal leader	Xianbei		
Lady Sun 孫氏				Fuchun, Wu (Fuyang, Zhejiang)	Noble lady	Sun Quan		
Lady Sun 孫氏					Zhong Yao's concubine	Cao Wei		
Sun A 孫阿					Musician	Cao Wei		
Sun Ba 孫霸	Ziwei 子威		250	Fuchun, Wu (Fuyang, Zhejiang)	Noble	Eastern Wu		Sanguozhi vol. 59.
Sun Ben 孫賁	Boyang 伯陽			Fuchun, Wu (Fuyang, Zhejiang)	General	Sun Quan		Sanguozhi vol. 51.
Sun Bi 孫弼					Politician	Cao Wei		
Sun Binshuo 孫賓碩				Beihaiguo (Changle County, Shandong)	Politician	Han dynasty		
Sun Bu 孫布					General	Eastern Wu		
Sun Ce 孫策	Bofu 伯符	175	200	Fuchun, Wu (Fuyang, Zhejiang)	General, warlord	Sun Ce	Sun Jian, Yuan Shu	See Eastern Wu family trees. Sanguozhi vol. 46.
Sun Chen 孫綝	Zitong 子通	231	258	Fuchun, Wu (Fuyang, Zhejiang)	General, politician, regent	Eastern Wu		Sanguozhi vol. 64.
Sun Chu 孫楚	Zijing 子荆			Taiyuan (Taiyuan, Shanxi)	General	Jin dynasty		Jin Shu vol. 56.
Sun Dan 孫耽					General	Eastern Wu		
Sun Deng 孫登	Zigao 子高	209	241	Fuchun, Wu (Fuyang, Zhejiang)	Noble	Eastern Wu		Sanguozhi vol. 59.
Sun Deng 孫登	Gonghe 公和					Cao Wei		
Sun Fen 孫奮	Ziyang 子揚		270	Fuchun, Wu (Fuyang, Zhejiang)	Noble	Eastern Wu		Sanguozhi vol. 59.
Sun Feng 孫奉			270	Fuchun, Wu (Fuyang, Zhejiang)	Noble	Eastern Wu		Sanguozhi vol. 46.
Sun Fu 孫輔	Guoyi 國儀			Fuchun, Wu (Fuyang, Zhejiang)	General	Sun Quan		Sanguozhi vol. 51.
Sun Gai 孫該	Gongda 公達		261	Renchengguo (Jining, Shandong)	Scholar, politician	Cao Wei		
Sun Gan 孫幹			258		General	Eastern Wu		Sanguozhi vol. 64.
Sun Gao 孫高					General	Eastern Wu		
Sun Guan 孫觀	Zhongtai 仲臺			Taishan (Northeast of Tai'an, Shandong)	General	Cao Cao	Zang Ba, Lü Bu	
Sun Gui 孫規					General	Eastern Wu		
Sun Hao 孫皓	Yuanzong 元宗	242	284	Fuchun, Wu (Fuyang, Zhejiang)	Emperor	Eastern Wu		See Eastern Wu family trees. Sanguozhi vol. 48.
Sun He 孫河	Bohai 伯海		204	Fuchun, Wu (Fuyang, Zhejiang)	General	Sun Quan	Sun Jian, Sun Ce	Sanguozhi vol. 51.
Sun He 孫和	Zixiao 子孝	224	253	Fuchun, Wu (Fuyang, Zhejiang)	Noble	Eastern Wu		Sanguozhi vol. 59.
Sun Hong 孫宏				Taiyuan (Taiyuan, Shanxi)	Politician	Cao Wei		
Sun Hong 孫弘					Politician	Eastern Wu		
Sun Huan 孫奐	Jiming 季明	195	234	Fuchun, Wu (Fuyang, Zhejiang)	General	Eastern Wu		Sanguozhi vol. 51.
Sun Huan 孫桓	Shuwu 叔武			Fuchun, Wu (Fuyang, Zhejiang)	General	Eastern Wu		Sanguozhi vol. 51.
Sun Hui 孫徽					Politician	Eastern Wu		
Sun Jian 孫堅	Wentai 文台	155	191	Fuchun, Wu (Fuyang, Zhejiang)	General, warlord	Sun Jian	Han dynasty, Yuan Shu	See Eastern Wu family trees. Sanguozhi vol. 46.
Sun Jiao 孫皎	Shulang 叔朗		219	Fuchun, Wu (Fuyang, Zhejiang)	General	Sun Quan		Sanguozhi vol. 51.
Sun Jin 孫瑾					Politician	Han dynasty		
Sun Jing 孫靜	Youtai 幼台			Fuchun, Wu (Fuyang, Zhejiang)	General	Sun Quan		Sanguozhi vol. 51.
Sun Jun 孫峻	Ziyuan 子遠	219	256	Fuchun, Wu (Fuyang, Zhejiang)	General, regent	Eastern Wu		Sanguozhi vol. 64.
Sun Kang 孫康				Taishan (Tai'an, Shandong)	General	Cao Cao	Zang Ba, Lü Bu	
Sun Kang 孫伉			192	Julu (Pingxiang County, Hebei)	Local leader			
Sun Kuang 孫匡	Jizuo 季佐			Fuchun, Wu (Fuyang, Zhejiang)	General	Eastern Wu		Sanguozhi vol. 51.
Sun Lang 孫朗	Zao'an 早安			Fuchun, Wu (Fuyang, Zhejiang)	General	Eastern Wu		
Sun Lang 孫狼					Rebel leader	Shu Han		
Sun Leng 孫楞					General	Eastern Wu		
Sun Li 孫禮	Deda 德達		250	Rongcheng, Zhuo (Rongcheng County, Hebei)	General	Cao Wei		Sanguozhi vol. 24.
Sun Liang 孫亮	Ziming 子明	243	260	Fuchun, Wu (Fuyang, Zhejiang)	Emperor	Eastern Wu		See Eastern Wu family trees. Sanguozhi vol. 48.
Sun Lü 孫慮	Zizhi 子智	213	232	Fuchun, Wu (Fuyang, Zhejiang)	Noble	Eastern Wu		Sanguozhi vol. 59.
Sun Lü 孫慮				Fuchun, Wu (Fuyang, Zhejiang)	General	Eastern Wu		
Sun Luban 孫魯班	Dahu 大虎			Fuchun, Wu (Fuyang, Zhejiang)	Noble lady	Eastern Wu		
Sun Lun 孫倫					General	Eastern Wu		
Sun Luyu 孫魯育	Xiaohu 小虎		255	Fuchun, Wu (Fuyang, Zhejiang)	Noble lady	Eastern Wu		
Sun Mao 孫茂					General	Eastern Wu		
Sun Mi 孫密				Taiyuan (Taiyuan, Shanxi)	Politician	Cao Wei		
Sun Mo 孫嘿					Politician	Eastern Wu		
Sun Qian 孫乾	Gongyou 公祐			Beihai (West of Changle County, Shandong)	Advisor, politician	Liu Bei	Tao Qian	Sanguozhi vol. 38.
Sun Qian 孫謙					General	Cao Wei		
Sun Qing 孫輕					Bandit	Cao Cao	Black Mountain bandits	
Sun Quan 孫權	Zhongmou 仲謀	182	252	Fuchun, Wu (Fuyang, Zhejiang)	Emperor	Eastern Wu		See Eastern Wu family trees. Sanguozhi vol. 47.
Sun Ru 孫孺	Zhongru 仲孺			Fuchun, Wu (Fuyang, Zhejiang)	Politician	Han dynasty		
Sun Shao 孫韶	Gongli 公禮	188	241	Fuchun, Wu (Fuyang, Zhejiang)	General	Eastern Wu		Sanguozhi vol. 51.
Sun Shao 孫紹					Politician	Eastern Wu		
Sun Shao 孫邵	Changxu 長緒	163	225	Beihai, Qingzhou (West of Changle County, Shandong)	Advisor, general	Sun Quan	Kong Rong, Liu Yao	
Sun Sheng 孫盛					General	Eastern Wu		
Sun Shu 孫樹		231	280		General	Eastern Wu		
Sun Song 孫崧/嵩	Binshi/Binshuo賓石/賓碩			Beihaiguo, Anqiu (Weifang, Shandong)		Liu Biao	Han dynasty	
Sun Tai 孫泰			234		General	Eastern Wu		
Sun Wan 孫𩅦					Crown Prince	Eastern Wu		
Sun Xia 孫夏			184		Rebel leader	Yellow Turban rebels		
Sun Xiang 孫香	Wenyang 文陽			Fuchun, Wu (Fuyang, Zhejiang)	General	Yuan Shu	Sun Jian	
Sun Xiu 孫休	Zilie 子烈	235	264	Fuchun, Wu (Fuyang, Zhejiang)	Emperor	Eastern Wu		See Eastern Wu family trees. Sanguozhi vol. 48.
Sun Xiu 孫秀	Yancai 彥才			Fuchun, Wu (Fuyang, Zhejiang)	General	Jin dynasty	Eastern Wu	
Sun Xu 孫諝			263			Eastern Wu		
Sun Yan 孫炎	Shuran 叔然			Le'an (Boxing County, Shandong)	Scholar	Han dynasty		
Sun Yi 孫翊	Shubi 叔弼	184	204	Fuchun, Wu (Fuyang, Zhejiang)	General	Sun Quan		Sanguozhi vol. 51.
Sun Yi 孫異				Fuchun, Wu (Fuyang, Zhejiang)	General	Eastern Wu		
Sun Yi 孫怡					General	Eastern Wu		
Sun Yong 孫邕				Jinan (Jinan, Shandong)	fangshi			
Sun Yong 孫邕					Politician	Cao Wei		
Sun Yu 孫瑜	Zhongyi 仲異	177	215	Fuchun, Wu (Fuyang, Zhejiang)	General	Sun Quan		Sanguozhi vol. 51.
Sun Yu 孫彧					General, politician	Jin dynasty	Eastern Wu	
Sun Yu 孫毓				Taishan (Northeast of Tai'an, Shandong)	Politician	Cao Wei		
Sun Yuan 孫元				Rongcheng, Zhuo (Rongcheng County, Hebei)	General	Cao Wei		
Sun Zhang 孫璋			189		Eunuch	Han dynasty		
Sun Zhao 孫肇					Major	Liu Yan		
Sun Zheng 孫拯	Xianshi 顯世		303	Fuchun, Wu (Fuyang, Zhejiang)	General, politician, poet	Jin dynasty	Eastern Wu	
Sun Zi 孫資	Yanlong 彦龍		251	Taiyuan (Taiyuan, Shanxi)	General, politician	Cao Wei		
Sun Zicai 孫子才					General	Eastern Wu	Cao Cao	
Sun Zong 孫綜					General	Gongsun Yuan		
Sun Zun 孫遵					General	Eastern Wu		
Suo Jing 索靖	You'an 幼安			Dunhuang County (Dunhuang, Gansu)	Calligrapher, general, politician	Jin dynasty	Cao Wei	Jin Shu vol. 60.
Suonu 瑣奴					General	Xianbei		
Supuyan 蘇僕延			207	Liaodong (Jinzhou, Liaoning)	Tribal leader	Wuhuan		
