= Sima Zhi =

3rd century Cao Wei state official

- 司馬芝

Minister of Finance (大司農)
- In office c. 230s–?
- Monarch: Cao Rui

Intendant of Henan (河南尹)
- In office c. early 220s – c. early 230s
- Monarch: Cao Pi / Cao Rui

Administrator of Yangping (陽平太守)
- In office c. 210s – c. early 220s
- Monarchs: Emperor Xian of Han (until 220) / Cao Pi (from 220)
- Chancellor: Cao Cao (until 220)

Administrator of Pei (沛太守)
- In office c. 210s
- Monarch: Emperor Xian of Han
- Chancellor: Cao Cao

Administrator of Ganling (甘陵太守)
- In office c. 210s
- Monarch: Emperor Xian of Han
- Chancellor: Cao Cao

Dalizheng (大理正)
- In office c. 210s
- Monarch: Emperor Xian of Han
- Chancellor: Cao Cao

Prefect of Guangping (廣平令)
- In office c. 210s
- Monarch: Emperor Xian of Han
- Chancellor: Cao Cao

Chief of Jian (County) (菅長)
- In office 208 – c. 210s
- Monarch: Emperor Xian of Han
- Chancellor: Cao Cao

Personal details
- Born: Unknown (Note: As Sima Zhi was referred to as a zuxiong (族兄) of Sima Lang, this implied that he was older than Lang, who was born in c.171.) Wen County, Henan
- Died: Unknown
- Spouse: Dong Zhao's niece
- Children: Sima Qi
- Relatives: Sima Lang (cousin); Sima Yi (cousin); see also family tree of Sima Yi
- Occupation: Official
- Courtesy name: Zihua (子華)
- Peerage: Secondary Marquis (關內侯)

Sima Zhi (fl.170 - 230s), courtesy name Zihua, was a government official who served in the state of Cao Wei during the Three Kingdoms period of China. He previously served under the warlord Cao Cao during the late Eastern Han dynasty.

== Early life ==
Sima Zhi was from Wen County (溫縣), Henei Commandery (河內郡), which is present-day Wen County, Henan. He was a distant cousin of Sima Lang and Sima Yi, whose descendants became the ruling family of the Jin dynasty. In his early life, when he was still a relative nobody compared to his cousins, Yang Jun (楊俊) (Note: The Wei Jin Shiyu recorded that Yang Jun's grandson Yang Yi was a maternal uncle of Sima Yue. Yang Jun himself was on good terms with Sima Yi; Sima Yi tried but failed to save Yang after the latter offended Cao Pi in 222 (Yang committed suicide).) recognised his potential and remarked, "Sima Zhi may not be as well known as Sima Lang, but he is actually more talented (than Sima Lang)."

Originally a scholar, Sima Zhi had to leave home when chaos broke out throughout China in the final decades of the Eastern Han dynasty. While en route to Jing Province (covering present-day Hubei and Hunan) in southern China, he and his fellow travellers encountered bandits in the hills near Luyang County (魯陽縣; present-day Lushan County, Henan). As the bandits approached, the other travellers abandoned their elderly and frail companions and fled. Sima Zhi remained behind to protect his mother. When the bandits brandished their weapons at him, he kowtowed and begged them to spare his mother: "My mother is old. Please help me take care of her!" The bandits said, "He's a filial son. It would be unrighteous for us to kill him." They spared him and his mother. Sima Zhi later found a cart for his mother to ride as they continued their journey towards the south.

Sima Zhi lived in Jing Province for over ten years and spent his time farming. He also strictly adhered to moral principles.

== Service under Cao Cao ==
=== As a county chief ===
In 208, Cao Cao, the warlord who controlled the Han central government, seized control of Jing Province after the provincial governor Liu Cong surrendered to him. Cao Cao recruited Sima Zhi into government service and appointed him as the Chief (長) of Jian County (菅縣; east of present-day Jiyang County, Shandong).

Around the time, as the Han Empire was in a state of disorder, there were many people who openly disregarded the laws. In Qing Province's Jinan Commandery (濟南郡), which Jian County was under, there was one Liu Jie (劉節) who served as a registrar (主簿) in the commandery office. Liu Jie came from an elite background and had over 1,000 retainers under him. Some of them were actually robbers and bandits, while others were corrupt bureaucrats.

When it was time for Wang Tong (王同) and some other retainers under Liu Jie to serve in the army, Sima Zhi's personal assistants reminded their superior that Liu Jie had never allowed anyone from his household to perform mandatory military service. Sima Zhi then wrote a letter to Liu Jie as follows: "Sir, you come from an influential family and occupy an important position in the commandery office, yet you allow your retainers to repeatedly avoid serving in the army. The people are very resentful and disappointed. Even the higher-level officials know about this. Wang Tong and the others are due to report for military service. Please send them over when it is time."

On the day the men were ordered to report for duty, Liu Jie not only refused to send Wang Tong and the others to the camp, but also secretly instructed (or bribed) a commandery-level inspector to go to Jian County and deliberately find fault with Sima Zhi's administration. Sima Zhi's subordinates felt intimidated by the inspector so they agreed to serve in the army in place of Liu Jie's retainers. When Sima Zhi found out, he wrote to Hao Guang (郝光), the Administrator of Jinan Commandery, to explain the situation and expose Liu Jie's wrongdoings. Hao Guang, who respected and trusted Sima Zhi, realised that Liu Jie was in the wrong so he ordered Liu Jie to serve in the army. Liu Jie had no choice but to follow orders. After this incident, there was a saying circulating around Qing Province: "(Sima Zhi) turned a commandery registrar into a soldier."

=== Refusal to associate with Liu Xun ===
Sima Zhi later became the Prefect (令) of Guangping County (廣平縣; north of present-day Quzhou County, Hebei). At the time, Liu Xun, one of Cao Cao's generals, behaved arrogantly because he believed that, given his past acquaintance with Cao Cao, no one would dare to do anything to him. When he was in charge of guarding Henei Commandery (河內郡), Sima Zhi's home commandery, he allowed his relatives, subordinates and retainers to behave lawlessly and do as they wished.

Liu Xun once wrote a letter to Sima Zhi, without signing off, to ask him for favours. Sima Zhi ignored Liu Xun and continued to do everything by the book. Later, when Liu Xun was accused of plotting a rebellion, many people who had connections to him were implicated and arrested. Sima Zhi, who was unaffected by the incident, received praise for his wisdom in choosing to distance himself from Liu Xun.

=== As a judicial officer and commandery administrator ===
Sima Zhi later served as a dalizheng (大理正; senior judicial officer) in Cao Cao's vassal kingdom of Wei (魏) after Emperor Xian enfeoffed the warlord as a vassal king in the year 216.

During this time, Sima Zhi heard a case of theft in which a maid was accused of stealing silk from the official treasury and hiding it in the latrine. She had already been arrested and thrown into prison for interrogation.

After hearing the case, Sima Zhi wrote to Cao Cao:

"One of the flaws of the criminal justice system lies in its severity and cruelty. In this case, the evidence was found before the suspect was brought in for questioning. When suspects succumb to torture during interrogation, they will most likely falsely admit to the crimes they are accused of, even when they are actually innocent. Confessions extracted through torture should not be taken as conclusive evidence of a suspect's guilt. It is in line with the teachings of the ancient sages to make the laws as simple as possible so that the common people can understand them. It is most vulgar and crude to assume that all suspects are guilty and go all out to make them confess just because we want to prevent those who are truly guilty from getting away. By releasing suspects, we are actually making it easier for the common people to understand the workings of the system. Is that not a better option?"

Cao Cao heeded Sima Zhi's advice.

Sima Zhi was later reassigned to be the Administrator (太守) of Ganling (甘陵; around present-day Linqing, Shandong), Pei (沛; around present-day Xuzhou, Jiangsu) and Yangping (陽平; around present-day Handan, Hebei) commanderies. He performed well while serving in these offices.

== Service under Cao Pi ==
Sima Zhi continued serving in the state of Cao Wei, established by Cao Cao's son Cao Pi, after the end of the Eastern Han dynasty in late 220. In the middle of Cao Pi's reign, he was appointed as the Intendant of Henan (河南尹), i.e., the administrator of the capital commandery. During his tenure, he kept elite influence in check, helped the poor, and governed in an impartial manner without showing favour to anyone. He also managed to convince Cao Pi to restore the wuzhu (五銖) coinage, which was previously used in the Han dynasty, as an official currency of the Cao Wei state.

On one occasion, a palace official wanted a favour from Sima Zhi but was afraid to ask him directly, so he requested Dong Zhao, an uncle of Sima Zhi's wife, to ask on his behalf. However, Dong Zhao also felt intimidated by Sima Zhi and did not ask him.

Sima Zhi once lectured his subordinates:

"Although a ruler plays a key role in shaping the rules of his government, it isn't possible for him to always ensure that his officials won't break the rules. When the officials break the rules, it is also not possible to always ensure that the ruler won't find out. If officials still break the rules, it is the ruler's fault. If the ruler finds out that officials broke the rules, it is the officials' fault. The ruler is first and foremost the one at fault if the government fails. The officials under him are next in line to be held responsible. Shouldn't all of you strive harder to do a good job in office?"

His subordinates heeded his words and worked diligently and faithfully.

In one incident, a sentry serving under one of Sima Zhi's subordinates was arrested on suspicions of stealing a hairstick. Although his statement contradicted the evidence, the authorities still deemed him guilty and threw him into prison. When Sima Zhi heard about it, he remarked:

"Sometimes things are so similar that it is difficult to tell them apart. If we don't make clear distinctions, people will be confused. We should look at the facts. How can anyone bear to harm a fellow human being just because of the loss of one hairstick? There's no need to pursue the matter further."

== Service under Cao Rui ==
In 226, after Cao Rui succeeded his father Cao Pi as the new emperor of Wei, he enfeoffed Sima Zhi as a Secondary Marquis (關內侯) to honour him for his contributions.

=== Case of Princess Linfen's servant and Cao Hong's wet nurse ===
Shortly after, a servant of Princess Linfen and the former wet nurse of the veteran general Cao Hong were arrested and imprisoned for heresy because they worshipped a certain "deity" of Mount Wujian (無澗山) at the northeast of Luoyang.

Grand Empress Dowager Bian, Cao Rui's grandmother, sent a palace eunuch, Wu Da (吳達), to order Sima Zhi to release Cao Hong's wet nurse and Princess Linfen's servant. Sima Zhi did not inform Cao Rui about the Grand Empress Dowager's interference in the case. Instead, he instructed the officials in charge of the case to continue performing their duties accordingly.

After the case was closed, Sima Zhi wrote a memorial to Cao Rui:

"All criminal cases involving capital offences should be sent to Your Majesty for approval before the death sentence is carried out. Previously, the imperial court issued an edict outlawing unorthodox and cult-like practices. Now, (Cao Hong's wet nurse and Princess Linfen's servant) have confessed to committing the offence of heresy. When the Grand Empress Dowager sent the palace eunuch Wu Da to relay her order to me, I did not inform Your Majesty because I was worried that someone would try to save the convicts. I would detain Wu Da if I had no other choice to prevent interference. It was my fault that the case took so long to be settled. I have violated standard protocol when I did not inform Your Majesty about the interference, and authorised the officials to settle the case on their own and execute the convicts. I am guilty and I now request to be punished by death."

Cao Rui replied: "I have read your memorial and I understand your intentions. You did the right thing when you followed the imperial edict and authorised the officials to perform their duties. As you were acting in accordance with an imperial edict, you did nothing wrong so there is no need to apologise. You do not have to inform me the next time a palace eunuch comes to see you."

=== As the Intendant of Henan ===
Sima Zhi served as the Intendant of Henan (河南尹) for 11 years. During his tenure, he dealt with numerous complex legal cases (e.g. cases in which the law could not be applied straightforwardly) and gained a reputation in the Wei imperial court for being impartial and fair.

In 231, when the various princes came from their respective principalities to Luoyang to pay tribute to Cao Rui, some of them violated imperial protocol by privately visiting officials based in Luoyang without permission. (The princes were forbidden from contacting officials in the central government without permission from the emperor.) When these violations came to light, Sima Zhi was accused of negligence as he allowed them to happen under his watch. As a result, he was removed from office.

=== As Minister of Finance ===
Sima Zhi was later restored to government service as Minister of Finance (大司農). Before he assumed office, the officials in charge of agricultural production had, in fact, been encouraging their subordinates and the common people to focus more on commercial rather than agricultural activities because commerce was more profitable.

Sima Zhi assessed the situation and wrote a memorial to Cao Rui:

"When a ruler governs his state, he should promote the primary industries and discourage under-performing industries. He should make the agricultural industry a top priority and recognise the importance of agriculture. The Book of Rites stated: 'if there was not a surplus sufficient for three years, the state could not continue'. (Note: This line is quoted from the "Wang Zhi" ("Royal Regulations") chapter in the Book of Rites. See the 24th segment of this translation by James Legge.) The Guanzi also mentioned that agriculture is very important. As of now, our two rival states have yet to be vanquished, and war is still ongoing. The State's top domestic priority is the accumulation of wealth and resources. Emperor Wu established the tuntian system for the purpose of creating a strong agricultural base. During the Jian'an era, all the granaries of the Empire were fully stocked and the people had sufficient food. Since the Huangchu era, as agricultural officials gained greater autonomy, they have been promoting their own interests. This is not beneficial to the State. Rulers see their states as their homes, hence the saying 'if the people are in want, their ruler cannot enjoy plenty alone'. (Note: This line is quoted from Chapter 12 of the Analects. See the last line in the 9th segment of this translation by James Legge.) The reason why there is a surplus is because people pay attention to the local climate and geography and use them to their advantage. Although merchants and traders can generate profit and wealth through commerce, their activities are not directly relevant to the State's grand plan of unifying the Empire. It is much better to open up more land for agriculture and increase production. Starting from the first month, farmers clear land, plough the fields, plant crops and mulberry trees, and end the cycle by collecting the harvest in the tenth month. In the remaining two months of the year, they build or repair granaries, roads, bridges, buildings, walls, etc. They are busy with agricultural-related activities throughout the year. The agricultural officials say: 'Those who remain behind to work in the fields replace those who go out to do commerce. We have no other choice. If we do not want to neglect agriculture, then we will need more manpower.' In my humble opinion, I think we should not allow commerce to take precedence over agriculture. We should set agriculture as our top priority and constantly remind ourselves to consider the State's long term interests. This is the best course of action."

Cao Rui heeded Sima Zhi's advice.

=== Later life and death ===
At the time, when some officials were summoned to meet their superiors, they often consulted their superiors' personal assistants to find out what their superiors wanted. The personal assistants then advised them accordingly and taught them how to provide satisfactory answers to their superiors. Sima Zhi, in contrast, was known for being candid, outspoken and upright. When he had disagreements with his colleagues during discussions, he voiced his objections in front of them, criticised them directly and never spoke behind their backs.

Sima Zhi died in office in an unknown year. His family did not have any excess wealth at the time of his death. Throughout the Cao Wei state's existence from 220 to 265, none of the persons who served as the Intendant of Henan managed to perform better in office than Sima Zhi.

== Descendants ==
Sima Zhi's son, Sima Qi (司馬岐; fl.215-239), inherited his father's peerage as a Secondary Marquis (關內侯). He initially served as an assistant official in Henan before he was reassigned to be a judicial officer. Later, he was promoted to the position of Chancellor (相) of Chenliu State (陳留國; around present-day Kaifeng, Henan).

During his tenure, the Wei imperial court ordered several prisoners to be transferred from Liang Commandery (梁郡; around present-day Shangqiu, Henan) to the counties in Chenliu State. All these prisoners were actually suspects being held in custody because their cases had yet to be settled in court. When the imperial edict reached Chenliu State, the county officials wrote to Sima Qi to seek permission to start building more prison cells and prepare the equipment required to hold the incoming prisoners. Sima Qi replied: "There are tens of such prisoners. They are cunning and deceptive. While they haven't confessed their guilt, they have already grown tired of being held in custody. You can tell from the way they are behaving. Why then should we continue to hold them in long-term custody?" When the prisoners were transferred over, Sima Qi interrogated them, determined their guilt, and settled all the cases within one morning. He was subsequently promoted to the position of Minister of Justice (廷尉).

When Sima Qi was Minister of Justice, the regent Cao Shuang monopolised power and controlled the Wei central government along with his supporters such as He Yan and Deng Yang. When one Gui Tai (圭泰) from Nanyang Commandery verbally defied an imperial edict, he was arrested and sent to the Ministry of Justice for interrogation. Deng Yang, who was in charge of dealing with the case, ordered Gui Tai to be severely tortured to force him to admit his guilt. When Sima Qi heard about it, he reprimanded Deng Yang: "The officials serving in the central government agencies are the pillars of our state. You are already failing to promote civil culture and morality, and you can't match the standards set by the ancients. What you are doing is exacting petty revenge on others and framing the innocent. You make the people feel panicky and fearful. Isn't this what you are doing?"

Deng Yang, feeling angry and embarrassed, gave up and backed down. Sima Qi later thought that he might have offended Cao Shuang and his supporters, and feared that they would find ways to get back at him so he claimed that he was ill and resigned. He died at the age of 35 (by East Asian age reckoning) at home. (Note: Since Cao Shuang's regency was from January 239 (Cao Rui's death) to February 249 (Incident at the Gaoping Tombs), Sima Qi's death year should be between 239 and 249. Thus, his birth year should be between 205 and 215.) His son, Sima Zhao (司馬肇), (Note: Not to be confused with Sima Zhao (司馬昭), Sima Yi's son with a similar-sounding name.) inherited his peerage as a Secondary Marquis (關內侯). Sima Zhao served as a Master of Writing (尚書) and as the Inspector of Ji Province during the Taikang era (280–289) of the reign of Emperor Wu in the Jin dynasty.

== See also ==
- Lists of people of the Three Kingdoms
