= Sima Fang =

Han Dynasty politician and official (149-219)

- 司馬防 / 司馬芳

Cavalry Commandant (騎都尉)
- In office ?–?
- Monarch: Emperor Xian of Han

Intendant of Jingzhao (京兆尹)
- In office ?–?
- Monarch: Emperor Ling of Han

Prefect of Luoyang (洛陽令)
- In office ?–?
- Monarch: Emperor Ling of Han

Personal details
- Born: 149 Wen County, Henan
- Died: 219 (aged 70)
- Children: Sima Lang; Sima Yi; Sima Fu; Sima Kui; Sima Xun; Sima Jin; Sima Tong; Sima Min
- Parent: Sima Jun (father)
- Relatives: (Details)
- Occupation: Official
- Courtesy name: Jiangong (建公) / Wenyu (文豫)
- Posthumous name: Marquis Cheng of Wuyang (舞陽成侯)

Sima Fang (149–219), courtesy name Jiangong or Wenyu, was an official who lived during the Eastern Han dynasty of China. Through his second son Sima Yi, he was an ancestor of the ruling Sima clan of the Jin dynasty of China.

== Life ==
Sima Fang's ancestral home was in Wen County (溫縣), which is present-day Wen County, Henan. He was a son of Sima Jun (司馬儁), (Note: not to be confused with his great-grandson with a similar-sounding name.) who served as the Administrator of Yingchuan Commandery (潁川郡) during the Eastern Han dynasty.

Sima Fang started his career as a minor official in his home commandery, Henei Commandery (河內郡). Later, he rose through the ranks to become the Prefect of Luoyang (洛陽令) and Intendant of Jingzhao (京兆尹) under the Han central government. In his old age, he was reassigned to be a Cavalry Commandant (騎都尉). He enjoyed reading the biographies of notable officials in the Book of Han and could even recite over 100,000 lines from the book. He died at the age of 71 (by East Asian age reckoning) in the year 219.

In the spring of 242 during the Three Kingdoms period, Cao Fang, the third emperor of the Wei state, honoured Sima Fang with the posthumous title "Marquis Cheng of Wuyang" (舞陽成侯) in recognition of the contributions to Wei by Sima Fang's second son, Sima Yi.

Sima Fang was known for being a serious and solemn man throughout his life; he was humourless even in informal settings such as banquets. He maintained a very low profile and avoided interacting with his colleagues outside the workplace. He was also strict and stern towards his sons even after they grew up and became adults. In his presence, they did not dare to move, sit or speak without his permission.

=== Relationship with Cao Cao ===
The Cao Man Zhuan (曹瞞傳), an unofficial biography of Cao Cao, claimed that when Sima Fang was serving as an assistant official in the imperial secretariat, he recommended Cao Cao to serve as the Commandant of the North District (北部尉) in Luoyang. However, the Sitishu Shixu (四體書勢序) mentioned that Cao Cao was recommended by Liang Hu (梁鵠). Pei Songzhi, who annotated Cao Cao's biography in the Records of the Three Kingdoms, commented that the Cao Man Zhuan account was correct. This was because, according to the Book of Jin (晉書) by Wang Yin (王隱), during the Jin dynasty, an academician once mentioned Sima Fang recommending Cao Cao to be the Commandant of the North District.

In 216, after Cao Cao was conferred the title of a vassal king – King of Wei (魏王) – by Emperor Xian, he summoned Sima Fang to meet him in Ye (in present-day Handan, Hebei). He joked with Sima Fang: "Do you think the Cao Cao of today can still be a Commandant of the North District?" Sima Fang replied: "When I recommended Your Highness to assume that appointment, I knew you were capable of performing your duties well." Cao Cao laughed.

== Names ==
Historical records traditionally recorded his name as 司馬防 (Sīmǎ Fáng) and courtesy name as 建公 (Jiàngōng). However, in 1952, fragments of a stone tablet detailing Sima Fang's life were discovered along Guangji Street in central Xi'an, Shaanxi, and they indicated his name as 司馬芳 (Sīmǎ Fāng) with the courtesy name 文豫 (Wényù) instead.

== Family ==
Sima Fang was an 11th-generation descendant of Sima Ang. His great-grandfather, Sima Jūn (司馬鈞), whose courtesy name was Shuping (叔平), served as General Who Attacks the West (征西將軍). His grandfather, Sima Liang (司馬量), whose courtesy name was Gongdu (公度), served as the Administrator of Yuzhang Commandery (豫章郡; around present-day Nanchang, Jiangxi).

Sima Fang's father, Sima Jùn (司馬儁), whose courtesy name was Yuanyi (元異), served as the Administrator of Yingchuan Commandery (潁川郡; around present-day Xuchang, Henan). Sima Jùn was described as eight chi and three cun tall, with a thick waist. As he had an extraordinary and impressive appearance, the folks in his hometown regarded him highly. He was also well-read and interested in history.

Sima Fang had eight sons: Sima Lang, Sima Yi, Sima Fu, Sima Kui, Sima Xun, (Note: not to be confused with his self-proclaimed descendant with a similar-sounding name.) Sima Jin, Sima Tong and Sima Min. Among them, the most notable one was Sima Yi, who served as a military general and regent of the state of Cao Wei in the Three Kingdoms period. Sima Fang's great-grandson, Sima Yan, later became the founding emperor of the Jin dynasty. Through his son Sima Kui, Sima Fang was also the ancestor of Northern Qi official Sima Ziru, (Note: This is per Sima Ziru's biography in Book of Northern Qi. (司马子如，字遵业，河内温人也。八世祖模，晋司空、南阳王。) Bei Qi Shu, vol.18. Sima Mo was the youngest son of Sima Tai, Prince Wenxian of Gaomi. (泰四子：越、腾、略、模。) Jin Shu, vol.37. Sima Tai himself was a son of Sima Kui. However, Sima Ziru's biography in Bei Shi did not mention that he was descended from Sima Mo.) Northern Zhou official Sima Xiaonan (Sima Ziru's son) and Sima Lingji (Sima Xiaonan's daughter), the last empress of Northern Zhou.

== See also ==
- Lists of people of the Three Kingdoms
