= Dong Zhao (minister) =

Cao Wei official (156 – 236)

- 董昭

Minister over the Masses (司徒)
- In office 230 – July 4, 236 (acting from 230 to August 232)
- Monarch: Cao Rui
- Preceded by: Wang Lang
- Succeeded by: Chen Jiao

Minister of the Guards (衛尉)
- In office 226 – August 232
- Monarch: Cao Rui

Minister Coachman (太僕)
- In office 226
- Monarch: Cao Pi

Minister of Ceremonies (太常)
- In office ? – 226
- Monarch: Cao Pi

Grand Herald (大鴻臚)
- In office 220 – ?
- Monarch: Cao Pi

Personal details
- Born: 156 (Note: Cao Rui's biography in the Sanguozhi recorded that Dong Zhao died on the yimao day of the 5th month of the 4th year of the Qinglong era of Cao Rui's reign. This date corresponds to 4 July 236 in the Gregorian calendar. Dong Zhao's biography also recorded that he was 81 (by East Asian age reckoning) when he died. By calculation, Dong Zhao was born in 156.); Dingtao District, Heze, Shandong
- Died: 4 July 236 (aged 80)
- Children: Dong Zhou
- Relatives: Sima Zhi's wife (niece)
- Occupation: Official
- Courtesy name: Gongren (公仁)
- Posthumous name: Marquis Ding (定侯)
- Peerage: Marquis of Leping (樂平侯)

Dong Zhao (156 – 4 July 236), courtesy name Gongren, was an official of the state of Cao Wei during the Three Kingdoms period of China. He previously served under the warlords Yuan Shao, Zhang Yang and Cao Cao consecutively during the late Eastern Han dynasty.

== Service under Yuan Shao ==
Dong Zhao was a xiaolian and served as a county official in his early years under the warlord Yuan Shao before being promoted to a military adviser. He was appointed as the governing official of several counties and commanderies in Yuan Shao's territories and governed them well. However, Yuan Shao listened to slanderous rumours and began to doubt Dong Zhao's loyalty towards him. Dong Zhao was fearful that Yuan Shao might kill him and he fled.

== Service under Zhang Yang ==
Dong Zhao wanted to flee to where Emperor Xian was. On the way, he passed by Henei Commandery, which was governed by the warlord Zhang Yang. Zhang Yang let Dong Zhao join him and appointed him as an official. In 192, when Cao Cao wanted to seek permission to pass through Zhang Yang's territory to receive Emperor Xian from exile, Zhang Yang initially refused, but after Dong Zhao's persuasion he agreed. Dong Zhao followed Cao Cao to receive the emperor.

== Service under Cao Cao ==
In 196, Emperor Xian met Cao Cao, who received him with all due respect after heeding Dong Zhao's suggestion. After the death of Zhang Yang, Dong Zhao went to persuade Zhang Yang's followers to join Cao Cao. By then, Dong Zhao had formally entered Cao Cao's service. In 199, after Cao Cao seized back Xu Province from Liu Bei, Dong Zhao was appointed as the Governor of Xu Province. Subsequently, Dong Zhao followed Cao Cao on the campaigns against Yuan Shao and the Wuhuan tribes and was promoted to even higher official positions. In 216, Dong Zhao aided Cao Cao by persuading Emperor Xian to confer on Cao Cao the title of a vassal king – King of Wei. In 219, while Guan Yu was attacking Fancheng, Sun Quan agreed to send reinforcements to help the entrapped Cao Ren. To keep things secret, Dong Zhao proposed a trick of tying the messages written on paper onto arrows which were fired into the city. When Cao Ren's troops heard that Sun Quan was willing to send reinforcements, the army's morale was boosted and eventually culminated in Guan Yu's defeat.

== Service in Wei ==
In 220, Cao Pi usurped the throne from Emperor Xian and established the state of Cao Wei to replace the Han dynasty. Throughout the reign of Cao Pi and his successor Cao Rui, Dong Zhao played an important role in state affairs by providing suggestions and advice to the emperors. He managed to predict the movements and decisions of the enemy accurately a few times and saved the Wei armies from defeat, such as during a campaign against the rival state of Eastern Wu in which Dong Zhao predicted correctly that there would be an ambush. Highly recognised for his contributions to the state, Dong Zhao was promoted to even higher official positions. In 236, Dong Zhao died at the age of 81 (by East Asian age reckoning) and was given a posthumous title of a marquis.

== See also ==
- Lists of people of the Three Kingdoms
