= Sima Lang =

Eastern Han dynasty official (171-217)

- 司馬朗

Inspector of Yan Province (兗州刺史)
- In office ? – 217
- Monarch: Emperor Xian of Han
- Chancellor: Cao Cao

Registrar to the Imperial Chancellor (丞相主簿)
- In office 208 – ?
- Monarch: Emperor Xian of Han
- Chancellor: Cao Cao

Prefect of Yuancheng (元城令)
- In office ?–?
- Monarch: Emperor Xian of Han

Chief of Tangyang (堂陽長)
- In office ?–?
- Monarch: Emperor Xian of Han

Prefect of Chenggao (成皋令)
- In office 202 – ?
- Monarch: Emperor Xian of Han

Personal details
- Born: 171 (Note: Sima Lang's biography in the Sanguozhi recorded that he died at the age of 47 (by East Asian age reckoning) in the 22nd year of the Jian'an era (196-220) of the reign of Emperor Xian of Han. By calculation, Sima Lang's year of birth should be 171.) Wen County, Henan
- Died: 217 (aged 46) Juchao District, Chaohu, Anhui
- Children: Sima Yi; Sima Wang (adopted)
- Parent: Sima Fang (father)
- Relatives: Sima Yi (brother); Sima Fu (brother); Sima Zhi (cousin); (Details)
- Occupation: Official
- Courtesy name: Boda (伯達)

Sima Lang (171–217), courtesy name Boda, was a government official who lived during the late Eastern Han dynasty of China. He was the eldest among the eight sons of Sima Fang, who served as the Intendant of the Capital (京兆尹) during the reign of Emperor Ling, He was described as a big and tall man (approximately 1.91 metres). In his early years, he took the tests required to serve as an official in the Han government and briefly held the position of a civil service cadet. In 189, Emperor Ling died. When the warlord Dong Zhuo seized control of the Han central government, Sima Lang managed to escape with his family and return to his hometown.

Later in 202, Sima Lang reentered government service and served in the central government, then under the control of the warlord Cao Cao. In his early career, Cao Cao served as a district security chief in the imperial capital Luoyang after Sima Lang's father Sima Fang, then the Intendant of the Capital, recommended him for the job. Now that Cao Cao had become the de facto head of the central government, he wanted to repay Sima Fang's favour by treating Sima Lang well. Over the subsequent years, he appointed Sima Lang to various positions as either a county prefect or county chief. When he held office, Sima Lang adopted policies which benefited the common people, and thus earned their respect in return.

In 208, after he assumed office as Imperial Chancellor, Cao Cao recruited Sima Lang to be his Registrar (主簿). Some time later, Cao Cao appointed Sima Lang as the Inspector (刺史) of Yan Province. Sima Lang performed well in office and gained much respect from the people in Yan Province. Despite his accomplishments, however, he never ceased to praise his younger brother, Sima Yi. He went so far as to say, "I don't even come close to matching his abilities."

In the year 217, Sima Lang accompanied Cao Cao's generals Xiahou Dun and Zang Ba on a military campaign against a rival warlord, Sun Quan. During the campaign, an epidemic broke out in the army and many soldiers fell sick. While distributing medicine to the soldiers, Sima Lang caught the disease himself and became ill too. He eventually succumbed to his illness and died.

Sima Lang had a son, Sima Yi (司馬遺; fl.217-226; note the different Chinese character for Yi from the one in Sima Yi's name). After Cao Rui ascended the throne, Sima Yi was appointed Marquis of Changwu Village (昌武亭侯) and given a fiefdom of 100 households. While Sima Yi was still alive, Sima Wang, one of Sima Lang's nephews, (Note: Sima Wang was a son of Sima Fu.) was transferred to Sima Lang's lineage (i.e. "adopted" as Sima Lang's son) to continue Sima Lang's family line. After Sima Yi's death, Sima Wang's son Sima Hong (Note: father of Sima Wei) inherited the peerage of his father's cousin.

== See also ==
- Lists of people of the Three Kingdoms
