= Xiangyun =

Xiangyun may refer to:

- Xiangyun (Auspicious clouds) (祥雲), traditional Chinese stylised cloud decorative patterns
- Xiangyun County (祥云县), Dali Prefecture, Yunnan, China
- Xiangyun, Fujian (翔云镇), town in Nan'an, Fujian, China
- Xiangyun, Henan (祥云镇), town in Wen County, Henan, China

People and fictional characters with the given name Xiangyun include:

- Xiang Yun (向云; born 1961), Singaporean actress and host
- Zhu Xiangyun (朱香云; born 1950), Chinese table tennis player
- Shi Xiangyun (史湘雲), character in Dream of the Red Chamber
