= Gao Rou =

Chinese Cao Wei official (174–263)

- 高柔

Grand Commandant (太尉)
- In office October 256 – October or November 263
- Monarch: Cao Mao / Cao Huan
- Preceded by: Sima Fu
- Succeeded by: Deng Ai

Minister over the Masses (司徒)
- In office May or June 248 – October 256
- Monarch: Cao Fang / Cao Mao
- Preceded by: Wei Zhen
- Succeeded by: Zheng Chong

Minister of Works (司空)
- In office 27 September 245 – May or June 248
- Monarch: Cao Fang
- Preceded by: Zhao Yan
- Succeeded by: Wang Ling

Minister of Ceremonies (太常)
- In office ? – 27 September 245
- Monarch: Cao Fang

Minister of Justice (廷尉)
- In office 223–?
- Monarch: Cao Pi / Cao Rui

Imperial Clerk Preparing Documents (治書侍御史)
- In office 220–223
- Monarch: Cao Pi

Administrator of Yingchuan (潁川太守)
- In office ?–220
- Monarch: Emperor Xian of Han
- Chancellor: Cao Cao

Gentleman of Writing (尚書郎)
- In office 213–?
- Monarch: Emperor Xian of Han
- Chancellor: Cao Cao

Personal details
- Born: 174 (Note: Cao Huan's biography in the Sanguozhi recorded that Gao Rou died in the 9th month of the 4th year of the Jingyuan era of Cao Huan's reign. This month corresponds to 20 October to 17 November 263 in the Gregorian calendar. Gao Rou's biography in the Sanguozhi also recorded that he was 90 years old (by East Asian age reckoning) when he died. By calculation, his birth year was in 174.) Qi County, Kaifeng, Henan
- Died: October or November 263 (aged 89)
- Relations: Gao Gan (relative) (Note: Gao Rou's relationship with Gao Gan was recorded differently in different sources. Gao Rou's biography in Sanguozhi recorded that Gan was Rou's elder paternal cousin (从兄). However, Pei Songzhi noted that in Xie Cheng's Houhanshu and Chenliu Qijiu Zhuan, Gan should be Rou's paternal uncle (从父); Pei couldn't determine the correct relation.)
- Children: Gao Jun; Gao Dan; Gao Guang
- Parent: Gao Jing (father)
- Occupation: Politician
- Courtesy name: Wenhui (文惠)
- Posthumous name: Marquis Yuan (元侯)
- Peerage: Marquis of Anguo (安國侯)

Gao Rou (174 – October or November 263), courtesy name Wenhui, was a Chinese politician of the state of Cao Wei during the Three Kingdoms period of China. He was a younger relative of Gao Gan. He previously served under the warlords Yuan Shao and Cao Cao in the late Eastern Han dynasty.

== Service under Cao Cao ==
In April 211, (Note: The Zizhi Tongjian recorded that Zhong Yao was sent to attack Hanzhong in the 3rd month of the 16th year of the Jian'an era of the reign of Emperor Xian of Han; the month corresponds to 1 to 30 Apr 211 in the Julian calendar.) Cao Cao sent Zhong Yao and Xiahou Yuan to lead an army to attack Zhang Lu in Hanzhong Commandery. As they were due to pass through the Guanzhong region along the way, Gao Rou advised Cao that by sending a large army westwards, Ma Chao and Han Sui would believe that the army was targeted at them; they would then rise in rebellion. What Cao Cao should do was to first pacify the Guanzhong region; once the region is stabilised, Zhang Lu would surrender once an edict was issued to him. Cao Cao ignored Gao; when Zhong Yao entered Guanzhong, Ma and Han did indeed rebel.

== Service under Cao Wei ==
Gao Rou was one of several officials who petitioned for clemency on behalf of Bao Xun; Cao Pi rejected their petitions and executed Bao.

During the Incident at the Gaoping Tombs, Sima Yi granted imperial authority to Gao Rou, who was then already 75 years old and the Minister over the Masses (司徒), appointed him as acting General-in-Chief (大將軍), and ordered him to take command of Cao Shuang's troops. He also told Gao Rou, "You're now like Zhou Bo." (Note: Sima Yi was alluding to Zhou Bo's role in the massacre of Empress Lü's clan after her death. However, the comparison was not apt as unlike the Lü clan, who were consort kin, Cao Shuang and his brothers were part of the imperial clan.)

On 3 June 260 (the day after Cao Mao's death), Gao Rou was among the senior officials (including Sima Zhao, Sima Fu and Zheng Chong) who petitioned Empress Dowager Guo to posthumously instate Cao Mao as the "Duke of Gaogui Village" (高貴鄉公) and bury Cao Mao with the ceremonies befitting that of a prince.

== See also ==
- Lists of people of the Three Kingdoms
