= Sima Shengzhi =

3rd century Shu Han official and scholar

- 司馬勝之

Cavalier Gentleman-in-Attendance (散騎侍郎)
- In office ?–?
- Monarch: Sima Yan

Prefect of Xinfan (新繁令)
- In office ?–?
- Monarch: Sima Yan

Prefect of Guangdu (廣都令)
- In office ?–?
- Monarch: Sima Yan

Master of Writing (尚書)
- In office ?–?
- Monarch: Liu Shan

Officer of Merit (功曹)
- In office ?–?
- Monarch: Liu Shan

Personal details
- Born: Unknown; Mianzhu, Sichuan
- Died: Unknown (aged 64); Mianzhu, Sichuan
- Children: Sima Zun; Sima Xian; Sima Zhuo
- Occupation: Official, scholar
- Courtesy name: Xingxian (興先)

Sima Shengzhi (fl. 250s–270s), courtesy name Xingxian, was an official and scholar of the state of Shu Han in the Three Kingdoms period of China. After the fall of Shu in 263, he continued serving under the Cao Wei state, then the succeeding Jin dynasty in 266.

== Life ==
Sima Shengzhi was born in Mianzhu, Guanghan Commandery (廣漢郡), which is present-day Mianzhu, Sichuan. He was well-versed in the Classic of Poetry and the Rites of Zhou, his character was naturally inclined toward simplicity and integrity with a calm and modest behaviour that did not seek personal gain. At first, he served as Officer of Merit (功曹). While in office, he revealed himself to be highly competent to manage government administration.

Thereafter, he was appointed as an official in the provincial administration, promoted to Master of Writing (尚書) in the Shu Han government then he was transferred to the imperial secretary. At that time, the officials of the commanderies were selecting candidates for state positions while Sima Shengzhi had to review them as secretary of the province. His work was comparable to a Shangshu Sheng. Again, he had a remarkable talent for selecting and promoting candidates. Although, Sima Shengzhi hold important positions in the court, he was still recognized as a model of virtue and filial piety. Therefore, he was highly respected in the region. At the end of Jingyao (景耀; 258–263), Sima Shengzhi was nominated as xiaolian (civil service candidate).

Following the Conquest of Shu by Wei, he served as a subordinate to the Bieja (別駕; important assistant to the governor of the province) of Liang Province. Thereafter, he was recommended as a xiucai (秀才; person who passed the county level imperial exam). And so, he served as the Prefect (令) of Guangdu (廣都) and Xinfan (新繁), where his governance was exceptional. Due to his pure and refined conduct, he was appointed as Cavalier Gentleman-in-Attendance (散騎侍郎). Where the imperial court treated him exceptionally well, as if he was a member of the royal family. However, he fall ill and resigned from his post.

After he returned home, Sima Shengzhi was still appointed as Administrator of Hanjia (漢嘉太守). Although many people came to congratulate him for his new position, He resolutely declined the assignment. As he preferred to live a simple, frugal and peaceful life. He would often say: "People in the world are not concerned with pursuing moral conduct, but only with pursuing wealth and glory. As for people like me, they may think that they have more than wealth and glory." Among the locals, he encouraged them to prioritize respect and humility. He died at his home at the age of 65 (by East Asian age reckoning). His three sons. Sima Zun (司馬尊), Sima Xian (司馬賢) and Sima Zhuo (司馬佐) were all known to be virtuous men.

== Appraisal ==
Chang Qu, who wrote Sima Shengzhi's biography in the Chronicles of Huayang (Huayang Guo Zhi), (Note: Sima Shengzhi's biography is recorded in the eleventh volume of the Huayang Guo Zhi, titled Biographies of later worthies (後賢志), covering the life of notable persons from the Sichuan region who lived during the Jin dynasty.) appraised Sima Shengzhi as follows: "Modest and virtuous, who followed the rules of ethics."

== See also ==
- Lists of people of the Three Kingdoms
