= Wenquan, Jiaozuo =

Wenquan 温泉镇
- Town
- Location in Henan
- Coordinates: 34°56′02″N 113°05′13″E
- Country: People's Republic of China
- Province: Henan
- Prefecture-level city: Jiaozuo
- County: Wen
- Elevation: 110 m (360 ft)
- Time zone: UTC+8 (China Standard)
- Postal code: 454850

Wenquan (simplified Chinese: 温泉; traditional Chinese: 溫泉; pinyin: Wēnquán; lit. 'hot springs') is a town in and the seat of Wen County in western Henan province, China, located about 9 km (5.6 mi) north of the Yellow River. As of 2011, it has 29 villages under its administration.

== See also ==
- List of township-level divisions of Henan
