= Ji Shao =

Jin dynasty minister (died 304)

- 嵇紹
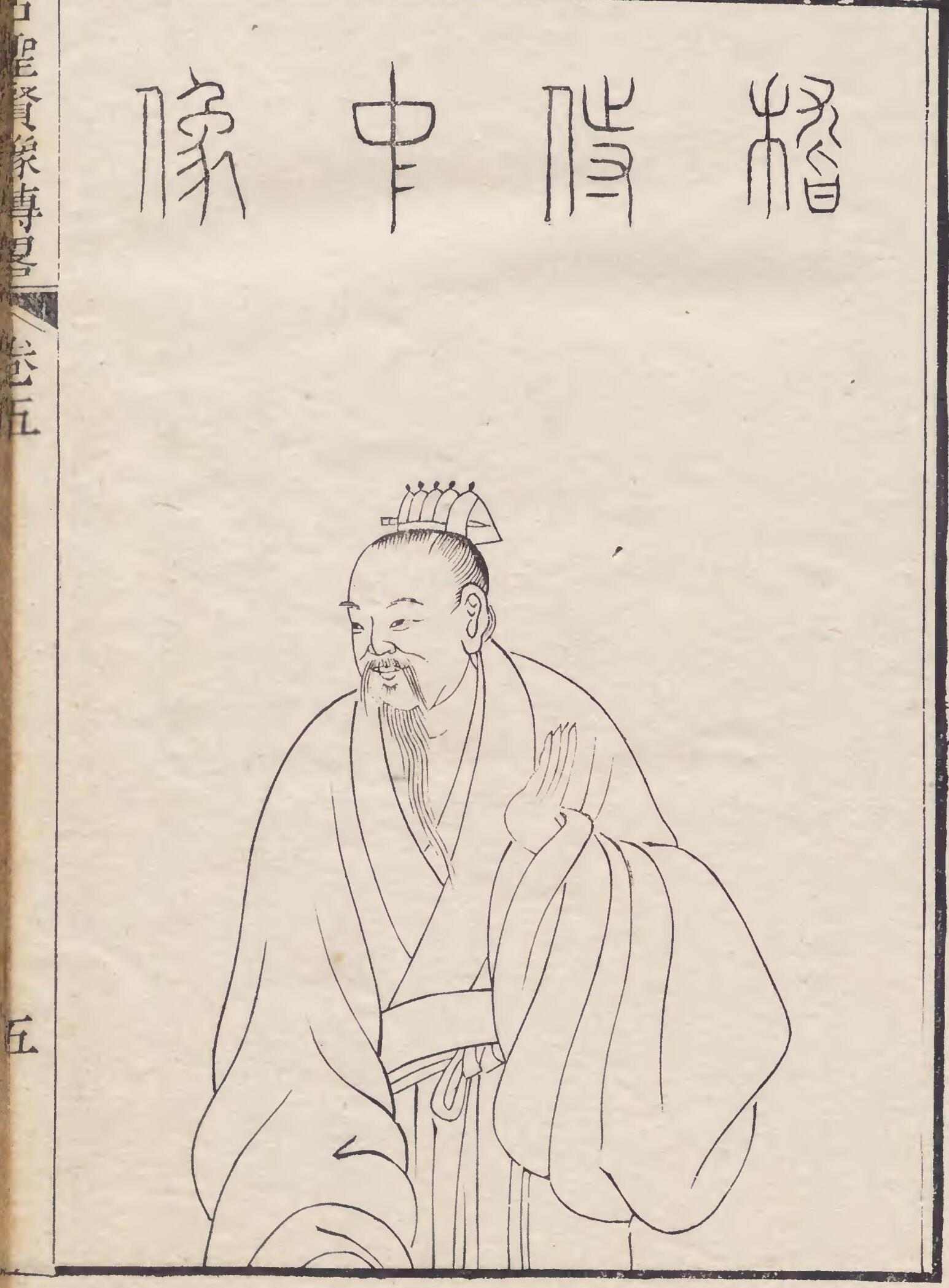

Palace Attendant
- In office 301–304
- Monarch: Emperor Hui of Jin

Personal details
- Born: between 253 and 255 (Note: There are multiple differing accounts on Ji Kang's death date; scholarly consensus is that he died between 262 and 264.) Suixi County, Anhui
- Died: c.9 September 304 Anyang, Henan
- Relations: Ji Han (cousin)
- Children: Ji Zhen
- Parent: Ji Kang (father)
- Courtesy name: Yanzu (延祖)
- Peerage: Viscount of Yiyang
- Posthumous name: Zhongmu (忠穆)

Ji Shao (c.254 – c.9 September 304), courtesy name Yanzu, was a politician of the Jin dynasty (266–420). He was the son of Ji Kang, one of the Seven Sages of the Bamboo Grove. Although his father was wrongfully killed by the ruling Sima clan, Ji Shao rose to become a prominent minister within the Western Jin court, reaching the position of Palace Attendant. He became embroiled in the War of the Eight Princes and immortalized himself by sacrificing his life to protect Emperor Hui of Jin at the Battle of Dangyin. Opinions on Ji Shao varied among contemporary and later scholars; he was praised for his exceptional loyalty to the emperor at Dangyin, but also criticized for going against the Confucian principle of filial piety by serving the family that killed his father.

== Early life and career ==
Ji Shao was the son of Ji Kang, a member of the famous Seven Sages of the Bamboo Grove. In c.263, when he was ten years old (by East Asian reckoning), his father was falsely accused and killed under the order of the Cao Wei regent Sima Zhao. For his safety, Ji Shao stayed in his home for the rest of his youth, where he gained a reputation being filial towards his mother. In February 266, Sima Zhao's son Sima Yan, posthumously known as Emperor Wu of Jin, established the Western Jin dynasty after forcing the last emperor of Wei to abdicate. In 274, Ji Kang's friend Shan Tao advised Emperor Wu to exempt Ji Shao from his father's crime and appoint him as an Assistant in the Palace Library. The emperor agreed, but took one step further by giving him the higher rank of Assistant Director. Ji Shao wanted to turn down the appointment, but after a personal visit from Shan Tao, he finally agreed.

Ji Shao was eventually promoted to Administrator of Ruyin Commandery. He was then transferred to the Interior Minister of Yuzhang Commandery, but as his mother had died around the time, he declined the position. After concluding his mourning period, he returned to the government as Inspector of Xu province, where he met with the provincial chief controller, Shi Chong. Shi Chong was known to have an arrogant personality, but Ji Shao would often reason with him, which earned him Shi Chong's respect. Afterwards, Ji Shao had to resign once again to mourn the death of his eldest son, Ji Zhen (嵇軫).

== War of the Eight Princes ==
=== Service under Empress Jia and Sima Lun ===
In 291, Ji Shao was reinstated as a Gentleman Attendant at the Palace Gate. By this time, Emperor Hui of Jin had succeeded Emperor Wu to the throne, but the imperial court was dominated by his wife, Empress Jia Nanfeng and her relative Jia Mi. Jia Mi wanted to befriend Ji Shao, but he did not respond. When the Jia clan was overthrown by the Prince of Zhao, Sima Lun in May 300, Ji Shao was thus spared and promoted to Regular Mounted Attendant while holding the position of State Academician. He was also enfeoffed as the Viscount of Yiyang.

In February 301, Sima Lun deposed Emperor Hui and usurped the throne. The Book of Jin states that after the usurpation, Sima Lun appointed Ji Shao as Palace Attendant, which he accepted. However, the Spring and Autumn Annals of the Thirty Kingdoms (三十國春秋) provides a lengthier and different account. It states that when Sima Lun was about to usurp the throne, Ji Shao was approached by the Prince of Yiyang Sima Jingyao, who showed him Emperor Hui's edict of abdication. When asked for his opinion, Ji Shao replied sternly, "Even if I die, I will never recognize another emperor!" Jingyao angrily drew his sword at him, but soon backed off. After Emperor Hui was sent to Jinyong Fortress (金墉城; northwestern part of Luoyang city), Ji Shao followed him and refused to deal with Sima Lun, which caused many people to worry for his safety. (Note: In his Zizhi Tongjian Kaoyi, Sima Guang recorded the two accounts, but chose not to include them in Zizhi Tongjian.)

=== Service under Sima Jiong ===
By July 301, Sima Lun was deposed and Emperor Hui was restored by the Prince of Qi, Sima Jiong. Ji Shao was again spared and remained in the government as a Palace Attendant. Soon, several officials wanted to posthumously reinstate the minister, Zhang Hua, who fell victim to Sima Lun's purges, to his office of Minister of Works. Ji Shao opposed them, asserting that Zhang Hua did little to prevent Empress Jia from seizing power and was even compliant with her undertakings. He instead argued that Zhang Hua should not be acquitted for his crimes, but out of leniency, the matter should not be pursued any further. He then submitted a petition addressed to Emperor Hui, Sima Jiong and the Prince of Chengdu, Sima Ying, encouraging them to rebuild and prevent calamity from befalling the state.

Sima Jiong, now regent to Emperor Hui, was close friends with Ji Shao and showed him preferential treatment. However, Ji Shao was concern for the prince's extravagant lifestyle as he built many buildings for his personal estate. He wrote a petition remonstrating Sima Jiong to stop, but although Jiong humbly responded, he did not change his behaviour. One day, Ji Shao visited Sima Jiong to consult politics. Jiong was holding a banquet at the time, so Ji Shao had to join and discuss current affairs with the prince's other confidants, Dong Ai (董艾) and Ge Qi (葛旗). Hearing that Ji Shao was talented in music and poetry, Dong Ai offered him a zither to play, but he refused, believing it inapproriate for him to be act like a performer while he was on official duty. He also warned Sima Jiong that as a highly important minister, he should be setting an example. Jiong felt ashame, while Dong Ai and the others felt awkward and left.

In January 303, Ji Shao was relieved of his duty in court and invited by Sima Jiong to serve as his Marshal of the Left. However, ten days later, Sima Jiong was killed while fighting the Prince of Changsha, Sima Ai in Luoyang. When the fighting first broke out, Ji Shao sensed that something was amiss and fled towards the palace. Supposedly, a crossbowman at the eastern pavilion spotted him and wanted to shoot him, but his fellow soldier, Xiao Long (蕭隆), upon seeing Ji Shao's appearance, felt that he was no ordinary man, so he personally stepped forward to snatch away the bolt, saving Ji Shao's life.

=== Service under Sima Ai ===
After Sima Jiong's death, Ji Shao decided to return to his old home in Xingyang. He was later invited to serve as Assistant to the Imperial Counsellor, but he declined and instead retained his position of Palace Attendant. In fall 303, Sima Ying and the Prince of Hejian, Sima Yong declared war against Sima Ai and placed him under siege at Luoyang. When Sima Ai was about to attack Sima Yong's forces in the west, he asked his followers who should be the commander. His generals and soldiers all elected Ji Shao to lead them into battle, so he was appointed General Who Pacifies the West and granted tally.

Despite holding out for several months, Sima Ai was eventually betrayed by the Prince of Donghai, Sima Yue and burnt to death by Sima Yong's general, Zhang Fang in March 304. At first, Ji Shao was restored to his position as Palace Attendant, but as many of the other officials went to Ye to apologize to Sima Ying, he was among the few to be dismissed and demoted to commoner status.

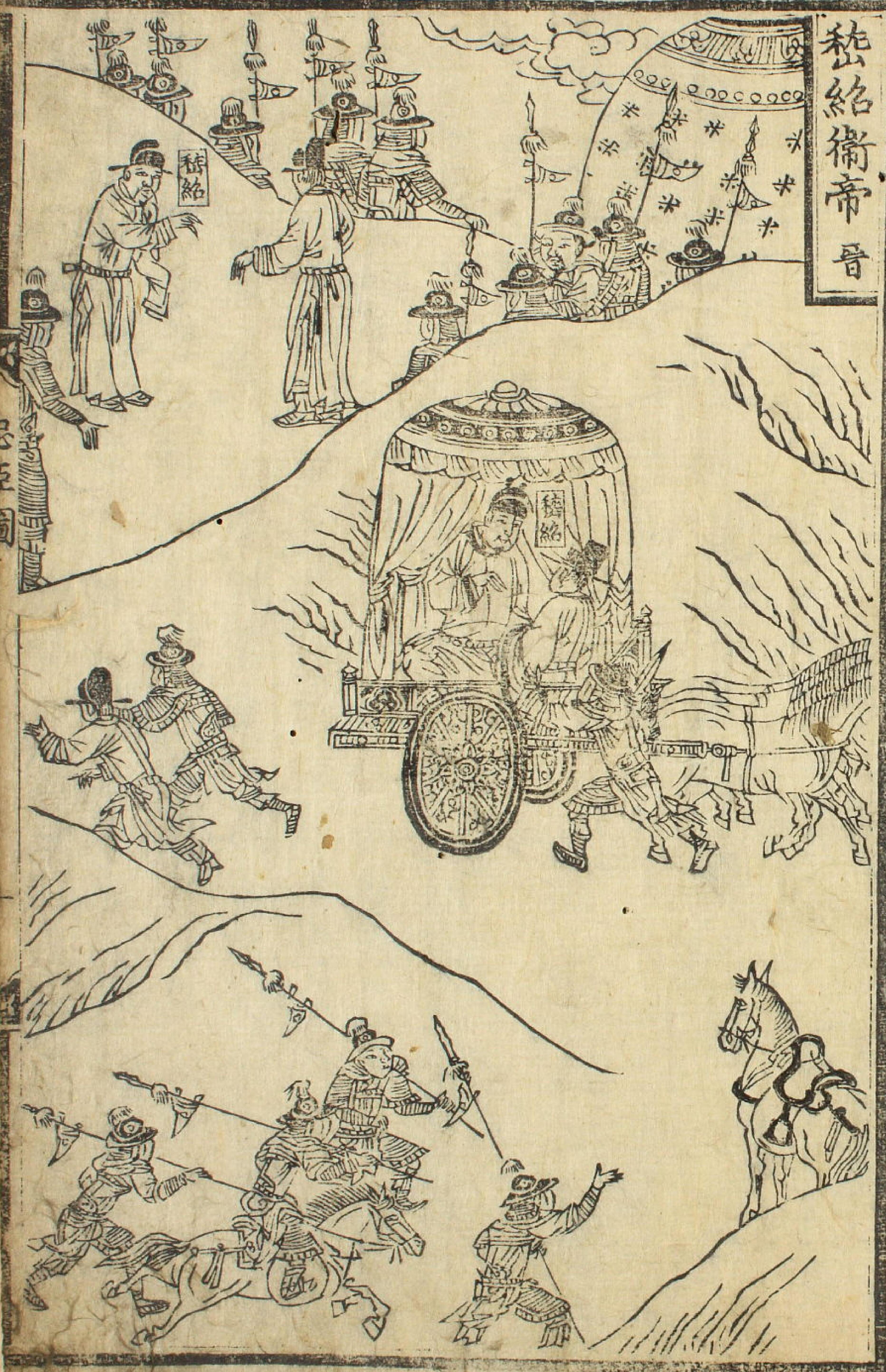
The Battle of Dangyin as depicted in the Samgang Haengsil-to (삼강행실도) from the Joseon era of Korea.

=== Battle of Dangyin and death ===
In August 304, Sima Yue rebelled against Sima Ying in Luoyang and planned to lead an army towards Ye with Emperor Hui. He summoned Ji Shao and reinstated him as Palace Attendant for the last time. Believing that the emperor was in trouble, Ji Shao rushed to his temporary palace upon receiving the edict. Before setting out, another Palace Attendant, Qin Zhun (秦準), warned him, "Now that you are departing, safety and danger will be difficult to ascertain. Have you got a good horse?" Ji Shao replied, "I will be guarding the imperial carriage, whether I live or die with it. What use would a good horse be?"

On 9 September 304, while Sima Yue's army was passing through Dangyin (蕩陰; in present-day Anyang, Henan) they were attacked by Sima Ying's general, Shi Chao and suffered a great defeat. Emperor Hui was injured in the face and hit by three arrows as all his officials and guards fled. Only Ji Shao remained behind, and still wearing his court dress, he dismounted his horse and entered the imperial carriage to shield the emperor. Sima Ying's soldiers eventually dragged him out and pressed him against a broken shaft of the carriage to impale him. Despite Emperor Hui's pleas, the soldiers killed Ji Shao and his blood splashed on the emperor's clothes.

Emperor Hui greatly mourned Ji Shao's death. After the battle, his servants wanted to wash his clothes, but Hui refused, saying, "This the blood of Palace Attendant Ji. Do not wash it off!"

== Evaluation ==
=== Posthumous honours ===
Later, Sima Yong had Emperor Hui forcibly relocated to his base at Chang'an in the end of 304. Though they were enemies, Sima Yong respected Ji Shao's loyalty and later submitted a petition to posthumously appoint him as Minister of Works and Duke of Yiyang. However, at the time, war broke out between with him and Sima Yue, who wanted to bring Emperor Hui back to Luoyang, so his proposal was never carried out.

In 306, when Sima Yue was stationed around the Xu region, he passed through Ji Shao's tomb at Xingyang. Yue wept, carved a stone tablet and erected a monument for Ji Shao. The prince also submitted a petition to confer official titles to him. In response, the later Emperor Huai of Jin posthumously appointed him as Palace Attendant and Household Counsellor with Golden Tassel, granted him a golden seal and purple tassel and promoted his peerage to Marquis of Yiyang. In addition, he was granted more land for his tomb with ten guest households and sacrifices through the Shaolao (少牢) rites.

The Prince of Langya, Sima Rui, who held command over the Jiangnan region, felt that Ji Shao's merits had not been sufficiently rewarded. After he was appointed Left Imperial Chancellor in 312, he awarded Ji Shao with the office of Grand Commandant and offered sacrifice with the Tailao (太牢) rites. When Sima Rui ascended the throne at Jiankang in 318, Ji Shao was given the posthumous name of "Zhongmu" (忠穆).

The Book of Jin, compiled by Fang Xuanling during the Tang dynasty, ranked Ji Shao as first in the entry titled "Loyalty and Righteousness". The expression of "Palace Attendant Ji's blood" (嵇侍中血), meaning loyalty, was invoked by the Tang poets, Du Fu and Han Wo, and then the Song dynasty general, Wen Tianxiang in his poem "The Song of Righteousness" (正氣歌). Ji Shao is also the origin of the Chinese phrase "A crane standing among chickens" (鹤立鸡群), which was used to describe him and now means to stand out among others.

=== Criticism ===
However, Ji Shao also had critics who believed that he had violated the Confucian principle of filial piety by serving the same family that falsely accused and killed his father. The scholar, Guo Xiang who lived during the same time as Ji Shao, thought that he was unfilial and that his sacrifice for a tyrant was only to satiate his own greed for power.

Xi Jian, another contemporary scholar and high-ranking minister of the Eastern Jin dynasty, had a discussion with his peer, Wang Yin on who was better between Ji Shao and Wang Pou. Similar to Ji Shao, Wang Pou's father, Wang Yi (王儀), was wrongfully accused and executed by Sima Zhao for his defeat at the Battle of Dongxing. However, Wang Pou became determined to never serve the Sima clan and did so up to his death. Xi Jian insisted that Wang Pou was better than Ji Shao for his filial piety. Alluding to Yu the Great, he further states that Ji Shao's situation was incomparable, as Yu's father, Gun had actually committed a crime that warranted a punishment from their ruler, Shun, unlike Ji Kang.

Song dynasty scholars, Sima Guang and Zhu Xi both commended Ji Shao for his deeds at Dangyin, but maintained that his service to the Jin was unfilial. During the late Ming and early Qing dynasties, Ji Shao was severely criticized by Wang Fuzhi and Gu Yanwu, both believing that, in any case, Ji Shao's loyalty should have lied with the Cao Wei dynasty, which his father had served, and that Dangyin did not absolve him from being unfilial.
