= Sima Wei (Jingyao) =

Western Jin Prince of Yiyang (died 301)

Sima Wei 司馬威

Prince of Zhangwu (章武王)
- Reign: 05 October 277 - 16 July 288

Prince of Yiyang (义阳王)
- Reign: 16 July 288 - c.July 301
- Predecessor: Sima Qi
- Born: Unknown
- Died: c.July 301; Luoyang, Henan
- Issue: None
Names
- Family name: Sima (司馬); Given name: Wei (威); Courtesy name: Jingyao (景曜)
Posthumous name
- none
- House: House of Sima
- Father: Sima Hong

Sima Wei (simplified Chinese: 司马威; traditional Chinese: 司馬威; died c.July 301), courtesy name Jingyao (景曜), childhood name A-pi (阿皮), was an imperial prince during the Western Jin dynasty. He was a son of Sima Hong (Prince Ping of Hejian), (Note: During the Cao Wei era, Sima Hong inherited the peerage of Marquis of Changwu Village (昌武亭侯) and fiefdom of 100 households from Sima Lang's son after the latter's death. The peerage and fiefdom were granted to Sima Lang's son during Cao Rui's reign; Sima Wang was about 21 years old when Cao Rui ascended the throne in 226. Thus, Sima Hong was likely born during Cao Rui's reign.) a grandson of Sima Wang (Prince Cheng of Yiyang), and a great-grandson of Sima Fu, Prince Xian of Anping and a younger brother of Sima Yi, regent of the Cao Wei state during the Three Kingdoms era. Besides his heritage, Sima Wei was best known for being one of a few people (possibly the only one) to be requested for execution by Emperor Hui of Jin.

== Background and life under Emperor Wu ==
Sima Wei was born to Sima Hong in an unknown year. When Sima Hong's second cousin Sima Yan (Emperor Wu of Jin and son of Sima Zhao) usurped the throne from Cao Huan in February 266, Sima Hong, together with his younger brother Sima Mao, father, uncles and grandfather, were made princes on 9 February. Sima Wang died in August 271, while Sima Fu died in April the following year. Sima Hong died on 7 March 276, and Sima Wei inherited his princedom. In October 277, the title of Prince of Hejian was given to Wei's cousin Sima Yong, while Sima Wei was appointed Prince of Zhangwu. In June or July 288, Sima Qi, son of Sima Yi (Wang's eldest son), lost his title of Prince of Yiyang due to an offence. Sima Wei was then appointed Prince of Yiyang.

== During Emperor Hui's reign and death ==
In May 290, just under two years after Wei was appointed Prince of Yiyang, Emperor Wu died. Emperor Wu's successor, Emperor Hui was developmentally disabled; his reign saw a series of regents who ruled on his behalf. Sima Wei's activities during the regencies of Yang Jun, Sima Liang and Wei Guan (who were co-regents), and Emperor Hui's wife Empress Jia Nanfeng, were poorly documented. He obtained his first position towards the end of the Yuan'kang era (291-299).

In May 300, Sima Lun the Prince of Zhao deposed Empress Jia in a coup. Sima Wei then aligned himself with Lun. In late January 301, Sima Lun was ready to usurp the throne. He dispatched Sima Wei to force Emperor Hui to relinquish the imperial seal. On 3 February, Lun declared himself emperor. The Spring and Autumn Annals of the Thirty Kingdoms (三十國春秋) recorded that when Sima Lun was about to usurp the throne, Ji Shao was approached by Sima Wei, who showed him Emperor Hui's edict of abdication. When asked for his opinion, Ji Shao replied sternly, "Even if I die, I will never recognize another emperor!" Sima Wei angrily drew his sword at him and backed off. After Emperor Hui was sent to Jinyong Fortress (金墉城; northwestern part of Luoyang city), Ji Shao followed him and refused to deal with Sima Lun, which caused many people to worry for his safety. (Note: This account differs from Ji's biography in Book of Jin, which stated that after the usurpation, Sima Lun appointed Ji Shao as Palace Attendant, which he accepted. In his Zizhi Tongjian Kaoyi, Sima Guang recorded the two accounts, but chose not to include them in Zizhi Tongjian.)

However, Sima Lun was unpopular as emperor. By late April or early May 301, the situation for Lun gradually worsened as Sima Ying won the Battle of Huangqiao and crossed the Yellow River to approach Luoyang. Officials in the capital were also beginning to openly express their frustration over Sima Lun and Sun Xiu, causing Sun to hole himself up in his office out of fear. Sun only moved to the office of the Masters of Writing after Sima Wei called him to discuss strategy. They ordered a full conscription of men in Luoyang to follow Sima Lun in battle. However, the conscripts later urged Sima Wei to kill Sun; Wei refused by secretly fleeing to his residence.

Sima Lun was deposed on 30 May and forced to commit suicide six days later on 5 June. After his restoration to the throne, Emperor Hui said, "A-Pi broke my fingers, and stole my seal; he must be killed." Thus, Sima Wei was executed. After his death, Sima Qi was made Prince of Jiyang to serve as Sima Wang's heir.
