= Sima Mao =

Western Jin Prince of Jingling (died 311)

Sima Mao 司馬楙

Prince of Dongping (东平王)
- Reign: 9 February 266 - c.308 (Note: Sima Mao's biography in Jin Shu recorded that he was made Prince of Jingling during the reign of Emperor Huai of Jin (307-311). The first record in Zizhi Tongjian of Mao as Prince of Jingling was in 310 (vol.87).)

Prince of Jingling (竟陵王)
- Reign: c.308 - 14 July 311
- Born: Unknown
- Died: 14 July 311 (Note: Sima Mao's biography in Book of Jin recorded that he died in the chaos of the Disaster of Yongjia, while Zizhi Tongjian recorded that he was killed on 14 July (the day after Han troops entered Luoyang).); Luoyang, Henan
- Issue: None
Names
- Family name: Sima (司馬); Given name: Mao (楙); Courtesy name: Kongwei (孔伟)
Posthumous name
- none
- House: House of Sima
- Father: Sima Wang

Sima Mao (simplified Chinese: 司马楙; traditional Chinese: 司馬楙; died 14 July 311), courtesy name Kongwei (孔伟), was the youngest son of Sima Wang, Prince Cheng of Yiyang, and a grandson of Sima Fu, Prince Xian of Anping and a younger brother of Sima Yi, regent of the Cao Wei state during the Three Kingdoms era. Besides his heritage, Sima Mao was best known for his friendship with his second cousin Sima Yao, (Note: During the Cao Wei era, Sima Hong inherited the peerage of Marquis of Changwu Village (昌武亭侯) and fiefdom of 100 households from Sima Lang's son after the latter's death. The peerage and fiefdom were granted to Sima Lang's son during Cao Rui's reign; Sima Wang was about 21 years old when Cao Rui ascended the throne in 226. Thus, Sima Hong was likely born during Cao Rui's reign. When Sima Wang was made prince in Feb 266, he was already about 61 years old. At the same time, Sima Yao's eldest brother Sima Jin was only about 10.) as well as his support for some of Emperor Hui's regents during the War of the Eight Princes. Eventually, Sima Mao died during the Disaster of Yongjia in July 311.

== Background and life under Emperor Wu ==
Sima Mao was born to Sima Wang in an unknown year as the youngest of four sons. His first recorded post was as a military officer under Sima Zhao in the early 260s, who like his father Sima Yi and elder brother Sima Shi, was also regent of the Cao Wei state. When his second cousin Sima Yan (son of Sima Zhao) usurped the throne from Cao Huan in February 266, Sima Mao, together with his elder brother Sima Hong (司马洪; father of Sima Wei), father, uncles and grandfather, were made princes on 9 February. Sima Mao's title was the Prince of Dongping and his fief consisted of 3097 households. Sima Wang died in August 271, while Sima Fu died in April the following year. Sima Hong died on 7 March 276.

== During Emperor Hui's reign ==
In May 290, Emperor Wu died. Emperor Wu's successor, Emperor Hui was developmentally disabled; his reign saw a series of regents who ruled on his behalf. During the regency of Yang Jun, father of Emperor Wu's second empress Empress Yang Zhi, Sima Mao supported Yang. This caused Mao great trouble when Yang was overthrown in April 291. Mao was supposed to be executed, but due to his friendship with Sima Yao, he was spared. This friendship turned out to be a double-edged sword; when Sima Yao was removed from his post on 12 May, Mao was also implicated and forced to his fiefdom. While at his fiefdom, Sima Mao was recorded to engage in business; he was also extravagant and enjoyed privileges beyond what his rank entitled him to.

Sima Mao's turn of fortune came in 300, after Sima Lun the Prince of Zhao overthrew Empress Jia Nanfeng in May and became Emperor Hui's regent. Mao supported Lun; when a coalition of Jin imperial princes formed against Lun in 301, Mao was made General of the Guards and supervisor of Lun's troops. However, Lun was overthrown in May, and Sima Mao was again implicated and relieved of his positions. Sima Mao's fortunes again turned in c.November, when his friend Yao was recalled to the Jin court; he was made General who Pacifies the East and Chief Controller of Xuzhou, and sent to garrison Xiapi.

In c.August 305, Sima Yue sent out a proclamation throughout the regions east of Luoyang calling for a campaign against Sima Yong, Mao's cousin. He cited that Yong's general Zhang Fang had forcibly moved Emperor Hui to Chang'an and aimed to bring him back to Luoyang. Sima Yue's brothers and several other prominent governors such as Wang Jun and Sima Xiao all joined him, which greatly disturbed Yong. Yue also began handing out new appointments to his allies without the emperor's consent, but when he tried to transfer the Inspector of Yu province, Liu Qiao and Sima Mao, who declared himself Inspector of Yan province, Qiao and Mao defected to Yong's side in c.September, with Liu Qiao accusing Yue of overstepping his authority.

In Ji province, Sima Xiao received some elite Xianbei and Wuhuan cavalry forces from Wang Jun. With them, Xiao and his general, Liu Kun launched a successful counterattack on Yong and Liu Qiao's forces in January 306, killing Shi Chao at Xingyang. Xiao's forces then routed Sima Mao at Linqiu (廩丘, in present-day Puyang, Henan) and forced him to flee back to his fief in Dongping. Then, they won a great victory over Liu Qiao at Qiao Commandery, causing his army to collapse.

== During Emperor Huai's reign and death ==
Emperor Hui died in January 307 and was succeeded by his half-brother Emperor Huai. Sima Mao was made Prince of Jingling during the reign of Emperor Huai, although the exact date or year is unknown. Mao still did not support Sima Yue, who was Emperor Huai's regent, and also Emperor Hui's last regent. In 310, Mao tried to attack Sima Yue's general He Lun (何伦), but was defeated. Blamed by Emperor Huai for the failure, Sima Mao fled Luoyang, and he was relieved of his posts. He avoided Luoyang until Yue's death in April 311. However, Sima Yue's death led to a further weakening of Jin imperial authority, which accumulated to the Disaster of Yongjia in July, where Mao was killed.
