= Nanzhangqiang =

Subdistrict in Wen County, Henan, China

Coordinates: 34°57′N 113°07′E

Nanzhangqiang (simplified Chinese: 南张羌; traditional Chinese: 南張羗; pinyin: Nánzhāngqiāng) is a town under Wen County, in Henan's Jiaozuo municipal region. It has 26,800 residents in an area of 32 km2.

== Administration ==
The town administers 15 village committees (2006). The executive, CPC sub-branch and PSB sub-station (paichusuo 派出所,) are in Nanzhangqiang Village.

=== Villages ===
- Nanzhangqiang (南张羌村)
- Beizhangqiang (北张羌村)
- Changdian (常店村)
- Mazhuang (马庄村)
- Zhujiazhuang (朱家庄村)
- Daquhe (大渠河村)
- Beiquhe (北渠河村)
- Nanquhe (南渠河村)
- Zhugou (朱沟村)
- Duangou (段沟村)
- Liuzhuang (陆庄村)
- Weigou (卫沟村)
- Yanggou (杨沟村)
- Rangou (冉沟村)
- Xugou (徐沟村)
