= Cangwu County =

Cangwu County 苍梧县 • Canghvuz Yen Tsangwu
- County
- Location of the seat in Guangxi
- Coordinates: 23.845°N 111.544°E
- Country: China
- Autonomous region: Guangxi
- Prefecture-level city: Wuzhou
- County seat: Shiqiao

Area
  - Total: 2,782 km^{2} (1,074 sq mi)
- Time zone: UTC+8 (China Standard)

Cangwu County (simplified Chinese: 苍梧县; traditional Chinese: 蒼梧縣; pinyin: Cāngwú Xiàn; Zhuang: Canghvuz Yen) is a county in eastern Guangxi Zhuang Autonomous Region, China, bordering Guangdong province to the east and south. It is under the administration of Wuzhou city. Liubao Tea is produced here.

== Administrative divisions ==
Cangwu County is divided into 9 towns:

- Lingjiao 岭脚镇
- Jingnan 京南镇
- Shizhai 狮寨镇
- Liubao 六堡镇
- Libu 梨埠镇
- Mushuang 木双镇
- Shiqiao 石桥镇
- Shatou 沙头镇
- Wangfu 旺甫镇

== Climate ==
Climate data for Cangwu, elevation 78 m (256 ft), (1991–2020 normals, extremes 1981–present)
Month	Jan	Feb	Mar	Apr	May	Jun	Jul	Aug	Sep	Oct	Nov	Dec	Year
Record high °C (°F)	30.2 (86.4)	36.1 (97.0)	35.4 (95.7)	38.6 (101.5)	38.3 (100.9)	37.7 (99.9)	37.8 (100.0)	37.1 (98.8)	36.7 (98.1)	36.5 (97.7)	33.4 (92.1)	30.8 (87.4)	38.6 (101.5)
Mean daily maximum °C (°F)	17.2 (63.0)	19.2 (66.6)	21.8 (71.2)	26.9 (80.4)	30.8 (87.4)	32.7 (90.9)	34.0 (93.2)	33.9 (93.0)	32.3 (90.1)	29.2 (84.6)	24.7 (76.5)	19.5 (67.1)	26.9 (80.3)
Daily mean °C (°F)	12.5 (54.5)	14.6 (58.3)	17.6 (63.7)	22.5 (72.5)	26.0 (78.8)	27.9 (82.2)	28.9 (84.0)	28.7 (83.7)	27.2 (81.0)	23.8 (74.8)	19.0 (66.2)	14.0 (57.2)	21.9 (71.4)
Mean daily minimum °C (°F)	9.3 (48.7)	11.4 (52.5)	14.7 (58.5)	19.4 (66.9)	22.8 (73.0)	24.9 (76.8)	25.6 (78.1)	25.4 (77.7)	23.6 (74.5)	19.7 (67.5)	14.8 (58.6)	10.1 (50.2)	18.5 (65.3)
Record low °C (°F)	1.2 (34.2)	2.6 (36.7)	3.3 (37.9)	9.6 (49.3)	14.1 (57.4)	15.5 (59.9)	19.1 (66.4)	21.6 (70.9)	15.5 (59.9)	9.1 (48.4)	3.5 (38.3)	0.1 (32.2)	0.1 (32.2)
Average precipitation mm (inches)	58.7 (2.31)	50.3 (1.98)	104.7 (4.12)	162.2 (6.39)	224.1 (8.82)	257.9 (10.15)	177.2 (6.98)	187.2 (7.37)	91.8 (3.61)	41.5 (1.63)	53.0 (2.09)	37.5 (1.48)	1,446.1 (56.93)
Average precipitation days (≥ 0.1 mm)	8.9	9.8	14.6	15.1	17.7	19.2	17.1	15.8	10.1	5.4	6.2	7.0	146.9
Average relative humidity (%)	77	78	82	81	81	83	80	80	78	74	75	74	79
Mean monthly sunshine hours	91.6	76.9	65.7	95.4	142.2	163.3	214.5	205.1	186.7	192.7	156.2	134.0	1,724.3
Percentage possible sunshine	27	24	18	25	35	40	52	52	51	54	48	41	39
Source: China Meteorological Administrationall-time May record highall-time October record
