= Sima Wang =

Jin dynasty Prince of Yiyang (205–271)

Sima Wang 司馬望

Prince of Yiyang (義陽王)
- Tenure: 9 February 266 – 16 August 271
- Successor: Sima Qi (Note: Sima Qi was the son of Sima Yi, Wang's eldest son. Since Yi predeceased his father, Wang's title of "Prince of Yiyang" was inherited by Qi. However, in June or July 288, Sima Qi lost his title due to an offence. The title of Prince of Yiyang was then granted to Sima Wei.)
- Born: 205
- Died: 16 August 271 (aged 66)
- Issue Detail: Sima Yi; Sima Hong; Sima Zheng; Sima Mao
Names
- Family name: Sima (司馬); Given name: Wang (望); Courtesy name: Zichu (子初)
Posthumous name
- Prince Cheng (成王)
- House: House of Sima
- Father: Sima Fu

Sima Wang (205 – 16 August 271), courtesy name Zichu, posthumously known as Prince Cheng of Yiyang (义阳成王), was an imperial prince and military general of the Jin dynasty of China. He previously served in the state of Cao Wei during the Three Kingdoms period.

== Life ==
Sima Wang was the second son of Sima Fu. Sima Wang's uncle Sima Lang had a son, Sima Yi (司馬遺; fl.217-226; note the different Chinese character for "Yi" from the one in Sima Yi's name). After Cao Rui ascended the throne, Sima Yi was appointed Marquis of Changwu Village (昌武亭侯) and given a fiefdom of 100 households. While Sima Yi was still alive, Sima Wang was transferred to Sima Lang's lineage (i.e. "adopted" as Sima Lang's son) to continue Sima Lang's family line. After Sima Yi's death, Sima Wang's son Sima Hong (Note: father of Sima Wei) inherited the peerage of his father's cousin.

Sima Wang started his official career in the state of Cao Wei during the Three Kingdoms period and served in various positions, including Administrator (太守) of Pingyang Commandery (平陽郡) and Agriculture General of the Household of Luoyang (洛陽典農中郎將). (Note: Sima Wang possibly succeeded his cousin Sima Zhao in this position.) In 251, he accompanied his uncle Sima Yi on a campaign against Wang Ling, who started a rebellion. After the rebellion was suppressed, the Wei government enfeoffed him as the Marquis of Yong'an Village (永安亭侯) to honour him for his contributions. Later, Sima Wang was promoted to a district marquis under the title "Marquis of Anle District" (安樂鄉侯) and given greater responsibilities as General Who Protects the Army (護軍將軍) and Regular Mounted Attendant (散騎常侍).

The Wei emperor Cao Mao (r. 254–260) was particularly fond of the literati, so he became close to notable members of the literati such as Sima Wang, Pei Xiu, Wang Chen and Zhong Hui. Cao Mao was known for being impatient and he wanted them to come for the banquets he hosted in the shortest time possible. Since Pei Xiu, Wang Chen, Zhong Hui and the others served as officials in the imperial palace, they were able to make it on time. Sima Wang, however, took more time to reach the imperial palace because he was stationed in a military camp. Cao Mao then gave him a fast-moving chariot so that he could travel faster, and also provided him five imperial guards as escorts.

At the time, Cao Mao was merely a puppet emperor as actual power was in the hands of the regent Sima Zhao (Sima Wang's cousin). Although Sima Wang was close to Cao Mao, he often felt uneasy in the emperor's presence so he requested to be assigned to positions far away from Luoyang, the imperial capital. (Note: Cao Mao himself would later die in June 260.) Cao Mao then appointed him as General Who Attacks the West (征西將軍) and granted him imperial authority to oversee military affairs in Yong and Liang provinces on Wei's western border. Before Sima Wang arrived in Yong and Liang provinces, the region was constantly under attack by Wei's rival state, Shu, as the Shu general Jiang Wei launched a series of invasions. After Sima Wang showed up, he strengthened the defences in the region and implemented new defensive strategies which successfully kept the enemy at bay and prevented them from gaining ground. After spending about eight years on the western border, Sima Wang was summoned back to Luoyang to serve as General of the Guards (衛將軍) and later as General of Agile Cavalry (驃騎將軍). Shortly after, he replaced He Zeng (何曾) as Minister over the Masses (司徒).

In February 266, following Sima Zhao's death in September 265, his son Sima Yan (Emperor Wu) usurped the throne from the last Wei emperor Cao Huan and established the Jin dynasty with himself as the emperor. After his accession, Emperor Wu enfeoffed Sima Wang as the Prince of Yiyang (義陽王), with a princedom comprising 10,000 taxable households, as well as 2,000 troops under his command. At the same occasion, his father, brothers and two sons Sima Hong (father of Sima Wei) and Sima Mao were also made princes. On 19 October 267, Emperor Wu appointed Sima Wang as Grand Commandant (太尉).

In c.December 268, Shi Ji, a general from the Jin dynasty's rival state Eastern Wu, led troops to invade Jiangxia Commandery (江夏郡). Sima Wang led 20,000 troops to garrison at Longbei (龍陂) and strengthen the defences around Jiangxia Commandery. Emperor Wu also granted him imperial authority and appointed him as Grand Chief Controller to supervise military affairs in the region. He returned to Luoyang after the Wu invaders were driven back by Hu Lie (胡烈), the Inspector of Jing Province. Sometime in the late 260s, the Wu general Ding Feng led his troops to attack the Jin position at Quebei (芍陂). When Sima Wang heard about it, he led Jin forces to repel the invasion but Ding Feng had already retreated on his own by the time Sima Wang reached Quebei. Emperor Wu further promoted Sima Wang to Grand Marshal (大司馬).

In 271, the Wu emperor Sun Hao personally led an invasion force to attack Shouchun (壽春; present-day Shou County, Anhui). Sima Wang then led 20,000 infantry and 3,000 cavalry to the Huai River region to strengthen the defences in the region. Sun Hao eventually withdrew his forces and returned to Wu. Sima Wang died later in August that year at the age of 67 (by East Asian age reckoning). Emperor Wu honoured him with the posthumous title "Prince Cheng" (成王); hence Sima Wang was formally referred to as "Prince Cheng of Yiyang". As Sima Wang was miserly and stingy while he was still alive, his family owned much wealth and property at the time of his death. Others scorned him for such behaviour. Sima Wang predeceased his father, who died in April the following year.

== See also ==
- Lists of people of the Three Kingdoms
