= Palace Attendant =

Title in Imperial China

Chinese name
- Chinese: 侍中
Transcriptions
Standard Mandarin
- Hanyu Pinyin: shìzhōng
- Wade–Giles: shih-chung

Vietnamese name
- Vietnamese: thị trung

Korean name
- Hangul: 시중; 중시
- Hanja: 侍中; 中侍
Transcriptions
- Revised Romanization: sijung; jungsi
- McCune–Reischauer: sijung; chungsi

Japanese name
- Kanji: 侍中
- Hiragana: じちゅう
Transcriptions
- Romanization: jichū

Palace Attendant, also known by its Chinese name as Shizhong, was a title in Imperial China comparable to that of the Grand Chancellor, the chief policy maker of the central government.

== History ==
The status and functions of the Palace Attendants underwent great changes. It designated a minister serving closely with the Emperor, comparable to the Grand Chancellor.

The Grand Chancellor was the head of the central government during the Qin and Han dynasties and during the Three Kingdoms period, the "highest official advisor to the Emperor." Under the Western Han, the Grand Chancellor's lieutenants—also reckoned as chancellors—were the censor general (dasikong), the liushi dafu, the commander-in-chief (dasima), and the defender-in-chief (taiwei). Under the Eastern Han, they included chancellors (situ), the censor general (sikong), and the defender-in-chief (taiwei).

By the Six Dynasties period, the status of chancellor was shared by several top administrators. Among them were the Inspector General of the Secretariat (zhongshunjian), the President of the Secretariat (zhongshuling), the President (shangshuling) and vice-president of the Department of State Affairs (shangshu puye), and the Palace Attendant. The Palace Attendants' status as chancellors by default continued through the Sui and Tang.

== Notable Palace Attendants ==
- Lu Wan (died 194 BC), Western Han dynasty
- Wei Qing (died 106 BC), Western Han dynasty
- Ji Shao (c.254 – September 304), Western Jin dynasty
- Lü Pi (died 461), Northern Wei dynasty
- Yuan Xie (died 508), Northern Wei dynasty
- Chen Qian (522–566), Chen dynasty
- Chen Shubao (553–604), Chen dynasty

== See also ==
- Chancellor (Tang)
- Menxia Sheng
- Uŭijŏng, a later development of the position in Korea
