= Sima Fu =

Jin dynasty Prince of Anping (180–272)

Sima Fu 司馬孚

Prince of Anping (安平王)
- Tenure: 9 February 266 – 3 April 272
- Successor: Sima Long (Note: Sima Long was a younger brother of Sima Chong; both were sons of Sima Yong. As Sima Yong and Chong both predeceased Sima Fu, Sima Long was made Prince on Anping on 30 March 273.)
- Born: 180; Wen County, Henan
- Died: 3 April 272 (aged 92)
- Spouse: Lady Li (main wife); Lady Fan (concubine)
- Issue Detail: Sima Yong (司马邕); Sima Wang; Sima Fu; Sima Yi (Zishi); Sima Huang; Sima Gui (Ziquan); Sima Gui (Zizhang); Sima Heng; Sima Jing
Names
- Family name: Sima (司馬); Given name: Fu (孚); Courtesy name: Shuda (叔達)
Posthumous name
- Prince Xian (獻王)
- House: House of Sima
- Father: Sima Fang

Sima Fu (180 – 3 April 272), courtesy name Shuda, posthumously known as Prince Xian of Anping, was an imperial prince and statesman of the Jin dynasty of China. He previously served as an official in the state of Cao Wei during the Three Kingdoms period before his grandnephew, Sima Yan (Emperor Wu), usurped the Wei throne in February 266 and established the Jin dynasty. Sima Guang, author of Zizhi Tongjian, claimed to be his descendant.

== Life ==
Sima Fu was the third among eight sons of Sima Fang, who served as the Intendant of the Capital (京兆尹) during the reign of Emperor Ling towards the end of the Eastern Han dynasty (c. 184–220). He was known for being well read, highly competent as an official, and generous towards those in need. He was also a close friend of Cao Zhi.

Sima Fu's second brother, Sima Yi, rose to power in the state of Cao Wei during the Three Kingdoms period (220–280), after the death of Cao Rui. Sima Yi became the sole regent and de facto ruler of Wei after seizing power in a coup d'état in February 249. After Sima Yi's death in September 251, his sons Sima Shi and Sima Zhao consecutively succeeded him as the regent and de facto ruler of Wei. During his service under the Wei regime, Sima Fu held relatively high offices: Prefect of the Masters of Writing (尚書令) during the reign of Cao Rui; and Grand Commandant (太尉) and Grand Tutor (太傅) during the reigns of Cao Fang, Cao Mao and Cao Huan. He also served as a military commander in some battles against Wei's rival states, Shu Han and Eastern Wu. In February 266, Sima Zhao's son Sima Yan forced the last Wei emperor Cao Huan to abdicate the throne in his favour, thereby ending the Wei regime. Sima Yan established the Jin dynasty and became its first emperor.

Sima Fu was known for his loyalty to the Wei regime, even after it was replaced by the Jin dynasty. (Note: However, Sima Fu did take part in the Incident at the Gaoping Tombs and was rewarded for his efforts.) During Sima Shi's and Sima Zhao's tenures as regent of Cao Wei, both brothers regarded Fu as an elder, and allowed him to show his loyalty to Cao Wei. In June 260, when the Wei emperor Cao Mao was assassinated during a failed coup to regain power from Sima Zhao, Sima Fu was one of the few Wei officials who wept at Cao Mao's funeral. (Note: After pleas from Sima Fu and other senior officials such as Gao Rou and Zheng Chong, Sima Zhao asked Empress Dowager Guo to posthumously instate Cao Mao as the "Duke of Gaogui Village" (高貴鄉公) and bury Cao Mao with the ceremonies befitting that of a prince.) In February 266, after Sima Yan established the Jin dynasty and became the emperor, he granted titles of nobility to his relatives, including his granduncle Sima Fu, whom he enfeoffed as the Prince of Anping. In response to his ennoblement, Sima Fu said, "I am, and always have been, a subject of Wei." (Note: This could be false modesty on Sima Fu's part, for at the same occasion, his sons Sima Wang, Fu (Prince of Bohai), Huang (Prince of Xiapi), Gui (Prince of Taiyuan), Gui (Prince of Gaoyang), Heng (Prince of Changshan), Jing (Prince of Pei) and Wang's two sons Sima Hong (father of Wei) and Sima Mao were also made princes. Fu's branch of the clan was the only one to have ten princes across three generations.) He also held the position of taizai (太宰; "Grand Chancellor") in the Jin government from 17 February 266 (Note: According to Sima Yan's biography in Book of Jin, Sima Fu was made Grand Chancellor on the yihai day of the 12th month of the 1st year of the Taishi era of his reign. This corresponds to 17 Feb 266 in the Julian calendar; this day was also 8 days after Sima Fu was made Prince of Anping, which took place on the dingmao day of the same month, and 9 days after Sima Yan crowned himself emperor, which took place on the bingyin day of the same month.) until his death in April 272 at the age of 92. He had at least nine sons and 14 grandsons. (Note: Jin Shu, volume 37. Due to his advanced age when he died, Sima Fu outlived some of his sons and grandsons.)

== See also ==
- Lists of people of the Three Kingdoms
