= Wen County, Henan =

Wen County 温县
- County
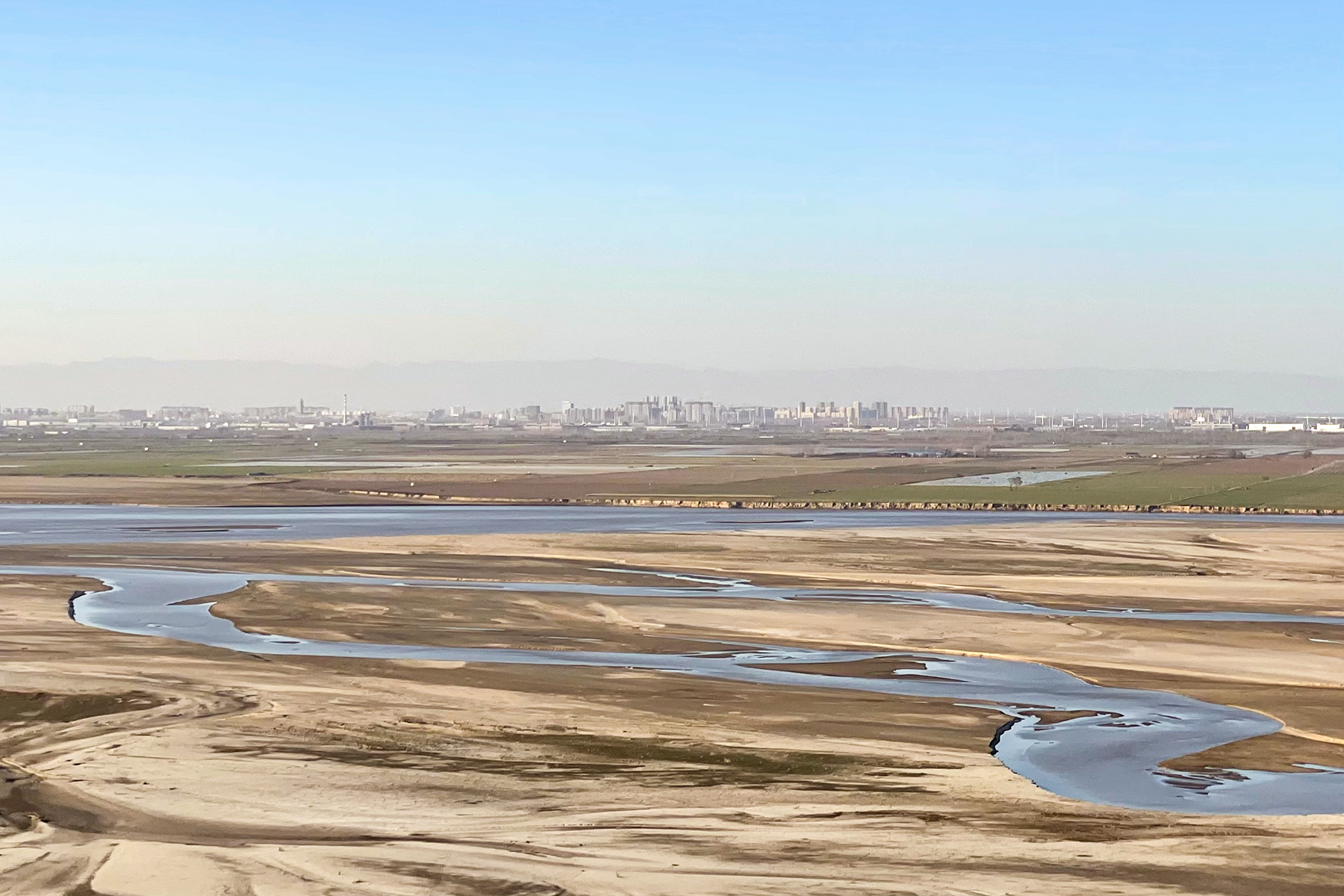

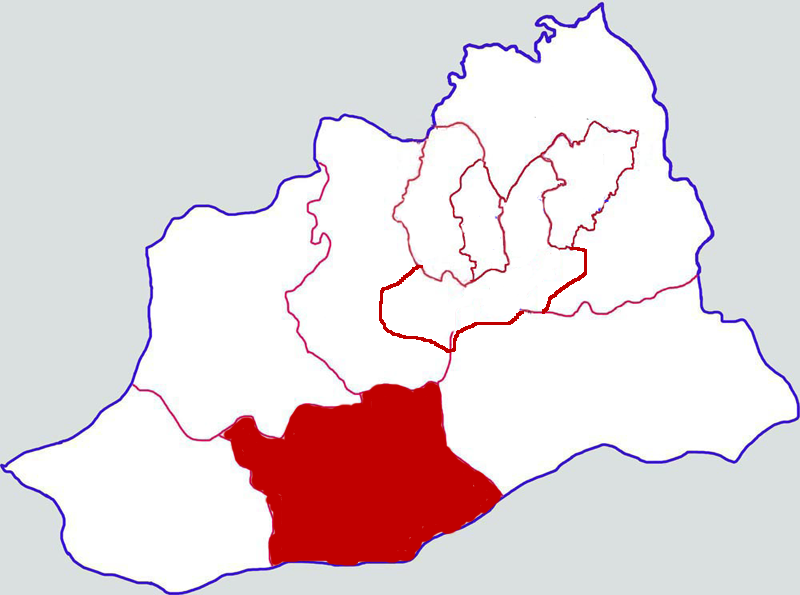
- Wen County in Jiaozuo

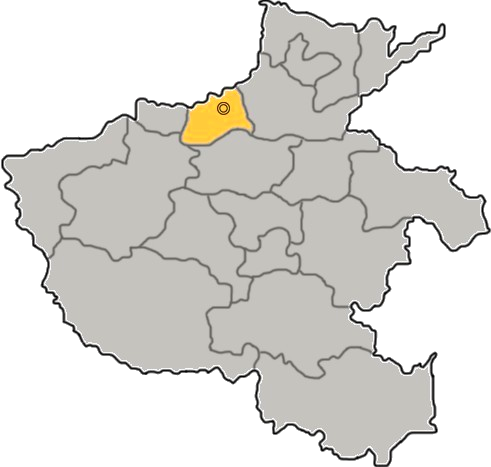
- Jiaozuo in Henan
- Coordinates: 34°56′23″N 113°04′51″E
- Country: People's Republic of China
- Province: Henan
- Prefecture-level city: Jiaozuo

Area
  - Total: 462 km^{2} (178 sq mi)

Population (2019)
  - Total: 420,900
  - Density: 911/km^{2} (2,360/sq mi)
- Time zone: UTC+8 (China Standard)
- Postal code: 454850

Wen County or Wenxian (simplified Chinese: 温县; traditional Chinese: 溫縣; pinyin: Wēn Xiàn) is a county under the administration of the prefecture-level city of Jiaozuo, in the northwest of Henan Province.

== Geography ==
Wen County lies on the left or north bank of the Yellow River, opposite the county-level cities of Gongyi and Xingyang in the Zhengzhou municipality. On all other sides the county is bordered by constituent parts of Jiaozuo: upriver to its west lies Mengzhou City, inland to its north Qinyang City and Bo'ai County, downriver to its east Wuzhi County.

== Climate ==
Climate data for Wenxian, elevation 106 m (348 ft), (1991–2020 normals, extremes 1981–present)
Month	Jan	Feb	Mar	Apr	May	Jun	Jul	Aug	Sep	Oct	Nov	Dec	Year
Record high °C (°F)	20.0 (68.0)	23.5 (74.3)	29.6 (85.3)	37.2 (99.0)	41.2 (106.2)	43.4 (110.1)	42.3 (108.1)	39.2 (102.6)	38.2 (100.8)	34.3 (93.7)	28.3 (82.9)	23.1 (73.6)	43.4 (110.1)
Mean daily maximum °C (°F)	6.1 (43.0)	10.0 (50.0)	15.8 (60.4)	22.5 (72.5)	27.9 (82.2)	32.7 (90.9)	32.5 (90.5)	30.8 (87.4)	27.2 (81.0)	21.8 (71.2)	14.3 (57.7)	8.1 (46.6)	20.8 (69.5)
Daily mean °C (°F)	0.6 (33.1)	4.0 (39.2)	9.5 (49.1)	16.0 (60.8)	21.5 (70.7)	26.4 (79.5)	27.5 (81.5)	25.9 (78.6)	21.5 (70.7)	15.8 (60.4)	8.6 (47.5)	2.6 (36.7)	15.0 (59.0)
Mean daily minimum °C (°F)	−3.5 (25.7)	−0.6 (30.9)	4.3 (39.7)	10.2 (50.4)	15.7 (60.3)	20.7 (69.3)	23.4 (74.1)	22.1 (71.8)	17.0 (62.6)	11.2 (52.2)	4.2 (39.6)	−1.6 (29.1)	10.3 (50.5)
Record low °C (°F)	−13.2 (8.2)	−13.8 (7.2)	−5.8 (21.6)	−1.1 (30.0)	5.2 (41.4)	12.2 (54.0)	16.7 (62.1)	11.9 (53.4)	6.6 (43.9)	−1.4 (29.5)	−9.6 (14.7)	−10.6 (12.9)	−13.8 (7.2)
Average precipitation mm (inches)	9.1 (0.36)	10.8 (0.43)	18.8 (0.74)	31.1 (1.22)	49.2 (1.94)	65.6 (2.58)	107.8 (4.24)	97.8 (3.85)	65.6 (2.58)	35.7 (1.41)	23.5 (0.93)	6.2 (0.24)	521.2 (20.52)
Average precipitation days (≥ 0.1 mm)	3.3	3.9	4.6	6.0	7.1	7.5	10.4	9.7	8.4	6.5	5.0	2.8	75.2
Average snowy days	4.0	3.4	1.3	0.2	0	0	0	0	0	0	1.0	2.4	12.3
Average relative humidity (%)	59	59	59	63	63	61	76	80	76	69	66	59	66
Mean monthly sunshine hours	136.6	146.6	188.3	219.9	238.4	222.3	197.4	193.6	166.8	164.3	153.3	146.5	2,174
Percentage possible sunshine	44	47	50	56	55	51	45	47	45	48	50	48	49
Source: China Meteorological Administration all-time January high all-time extreme temperature

== Administration ==
The county comprises 7 towns and 3 townships, overseeing 262 village committees and 5 neighbourhoods (社区; shèqū). The county executive, legislature and judiciary are in Wenquan (温泉镇), together with the CPC and PSB branches. Address for executive: #55 Huanghe Rd (黄河路55号).

=== Towns ===
- Wenquan Town (温泉镇) - county seat
- Xiangyun (祥云镇)
- Fantian (番田镇)
- Huangzhuang (黄庄镇)
- Zhaobao (赵堡镇)
- Nanzhangqiang (南张羌镇)
- Wude (武德镇)

=== Townships ===
- Qiucun (岳村乡)
- Zhaoxian (招贤乡)
- Beiling (北冷乡)
