= 320s =

Decade

The 320s decade ran from January 1, 320, to December 31, 329.

== Events ==
=== By place ===
==== Roman Empire ====
- Crispus, eldest son of Constantine I, leads a victorious campaign against the Franks, assuring twenty years of peace along the Rhine frontier. He establishes his residence in Augusta Treverorum (modern Trier), capital of Germania.
- Licinius reneges on the religious freedom promised by the Edict of Milan, and begins a new persecution of Christians in the Eastern Roman Empire. He imprisons Christians, confiscates their properties and destroys churches.

==== Asia ====
- King Chandragupta I founds the Gupta dynasty in northern India (approximate date).
- Zhang Shi (張寔), Zhang Duke of Xiping and governor of Liang Province, (涼州)is assassinated by Yan She (閻涉) and Zhao Ang (趙卬) and replaced by Zhang Mao (張茂), commonly accepted first ruler of the Chinese state Former Liang.

=== By topic ===
==== Art ====
- Construction begins on the Old St. Peter's Basilica, Rome (approximate date).

==== Culture and Religion ====
- In Nydam Mose (Denmark), the Nydam oak boat is sacrificed by the Danes (the boat is excavated in the 1830s, when a local farmer finds weapons, including swords and spears).

==== Science ====
- October 18 – Pappus of Alexandria, Greek philosopher, observes an eclipse of the sun and writes a commentary on The Great Astronomer (Almagest).

=== By topic ===
==== Roman Empire ====
- Emperor Constantine I expels the Goths from the Danube frontier and repairs Trajan's Bridge. He leads an expedition into the old province Dacia (modern Romania) and makes peace with the barbarians.
- March 7 - Constantine I signs legislation directing urban residents to refrain from work, and businesses to be closed, on the "venerable day of the Sun". An exception is made for agriculture.

==== Asia ====
- Tuoba Heru launches a coup d'état against his cousin Tuoba Yulü and becomes the new Prince of Dai.

=== By topic ===
==== Art and Science ====
- Calcidius translates Plato into Latin.

==== Food and Drink ====
- Constantine I assigns convicts to grind Rome's flour, in a move to hold back the rising price of food in an empire whose population has shrunk as a result of plague.

==== Religion ====
- The Christian Church is allowed to hold property.
- A synod held in Alexandria condemns Arianism.
- History of the Jews in Germany: Jews in modern-day Germany are documented for the first time, in Colonia Agrippinensium (modern-day Cologne).

=== By topic ===
==== Technology ====
- The first dependable representation of a horse rider with paired stirrups is found in China, in a Jin Dynasty tomb.

=== By place ===
==== Roman Empire ====
- Emperor Constantine the Great defeats the invading Goths and Sarmatians north of the Danube in Dacia, and claims the title of Sarmaticus Maximus.

==== China ====
- Crown Prince Ming of Jin succeeds his father Yuan of Jin as emperor of the Eastern Jin Dynasty.

=== Roman Empire ===
- January 1 – Flavius Julius Crispus Caesar, the sons of the Emperor Constantine and his expected heir, and Flavius Claudius Constantinus begin their one year terms as the new Roman consuls.
- June – The earliest known use of the Greek word monachós to refer to a monk is made in a petition filed in Egypt by a man named Aurelius Isidorus, a man from the town of Karanis in Egypt.
- July 3 – Battle of Adrianople: Emperor Constantine the Great defeats his rival Licinius near Adrianople, forcing him to retreat to Byzantium. Constantine then invades Thrace with a Visigothic force and raids the countryside.
- July – Battle of the Hellespont: Flavius Julius Crispus, the designated heir of his father Constantine, destroys the naval fleet of Licinius in the Dardanelles, allowing Constantine to cross over the Bosphorus into Asian provinces. Byzantium is besieged and Licinius assembles a second military force, under his newly elevated co-emperor Martinian at Lampsacus (modern-day Lapseki).
- September 18 – Battle of Chrysopolis: Constantine I definitively defeats Licinius at Chrysopolis, and becomes sole Emperor, thus ending the period of the Tetrarchy. Licinius escapes and gathers around 30,000 of his surviving troops at Nicomedia. Thus, the Civil wars of the Tetrarchy, which began in 306, end with Constantine ruling as sole Emperor.
- November 8 – Emperor Constantine declares his son, Flavius Julius Constantius, to the rank of caesar, designating Flavius as his successor. Flavius will ascend the throne as Constantine the Second in 337 AD.
- November 9 – Dedication of the Lateran Basilica in Rome.
- December 19 – Licinius abdicates his position as Emperor. He is pardoned by Constantine I as a result of the supplication of his wife Constantia (who is Constantine's halfsister), and banished to Thessalonica as a private citizen.
- (Date unknown) The Roman Emperor Constantine I seizes the Byzantine Empire's capital, Byzantium, and commences work on rebuilding the city as the Eastern Empire's capital, which he will inaugurate as Constantinople in 330.
- Constantine reorganises the Roman army in smaller units classified into three grades: palatini, (imperial escort armies); comitatenses, (forces based in frontier provinces) and limitanei (auxilia border troops).

=== China ===
- August 9 – (guiyou day of the 7th month of the 2nd year of the Tai'ning era) In Jin dynasty China, the rebel warlord Wang Dun succumbs to illness as the armies of the Emperor Ming of Jin are approaching his camp.

=== By place ===
==== Roman Empire ====
- German and Sarmatian campaigns of Constantine: Emperor Constantine I personally assures the security of the Danube frontier by defeating the Goths, the Vandals and the Sarmatians.
- Constantine has deposed Emperors Licinius and Martinian executed in Thessalonica and Cappadocia respectively for conspiring and raising troops against him.
- Constantine forbids criminals being forced to fight to the death as gladiators.

==== China ====
- April 1 – Crown Prince Cheng of Jin, age 4, succeeds his father Ming of Jin as emperor of the Eastern Jin dynasty. During his reign, he is largely advised by regents, his uncle Yu Liang and high-level officials.

=== By topic ===
==== Art ====
- The Colossus of Constantine in the Basilica of Maxentius and Constantine, Rome, is perhaps remodelled at about this date. (The remains are moved to the Palazzo dei Conservatori, Rome, in the 15th century).

==== Religion ====
- May 20 – First Council of Nicaea: Constantine summons an ecumenical council of bishops in Nicaea (Turkey). The Nicene Creed, adopted on June 19, declares that the members of the Trinity (the Father, the Son, and the Holy Spirit) are equal. The council decides that Easter is celebrated on the first Sunday after the first full moon after the vernal equinox. Arius is exiled to Illyria; his works are confiscated and consigned to the flames.

=== By place ===
==== Roman Empire ====
- Emperor Constantine the Great travels to Rome to celebrate the 20th anniversary of his accession to power, but while en route at Pola he orders his older son, Crispus Caesar, to be executed, possibly on charges of adultery. Later, Fausta, second wife of Constantine I, is also executed by being suffocated or boiled in a hot bath.

=== By topic ===
==== Religion ====
- September 14 (traditional date) – Helena, mother of Constantine I, discovers the so-called True Cross and the Holy Sepulchre (Jesus's tomb) in Jerusalem. On her pilgrimage, which begins about this year, she pauses on the Aegean island of Patmos, where she is said to found the church of Panagia Ekatontapiliani.
- Helena tells Constantine that he must atone for executing his son and wife by building churches, and at about this date construction begins on Old St. Peter's Basilica, the first church on the traditional site of Saint Peter's tomb in Rome, and on the basilica of Golgotha on Calvary outside Jerusalem. He also commissions construction of the Church of the Nativity in Bethlehem (dedicated 339).
- Christianity is introduced to the Kingdom of Iberia (modern-day Georgia) by Saint Nino (approximate date).

=== By place ===
==== Roman Empire ====
- Emperor Constantine the Great decrees that rural slaves can only be sold in the province where they reside, in order to resolve the shortage of labour in the Roman Empire.

=== By topic ===
==== Religion ====
- Construction begins on the Great Church of Antioch, which will be completed in 341.
- Approximate traditional date – Helena, mother of Constantine, returning from her pilgrimage to the Holy Land, founds Stavrovouni Monastery on Cyprus.

=== By place ===
==== Roman Empire ====
- July 5 – Constantine's Bridge, built over the Danube between Sucidava (Corabia, Romania) and Oescus (Gigen, Bulgaria), is officially opened by the Roman architect Theophilus Patricius.
- December 7 – Lakhmid king Imru' al-Qays ibn 'Amr dies. His epitaph, the Namara inscription, is an important source for the Arabic Language.

=== By topic ===
==== Religion ====
- May 9 – Athanasius is elected pope of Alexandria following the death of Alexander I.

=== By place ===
==== China ====
- The Han-Zhao dynasty, a Southern Xiongnu state during the Sixteen Kingdoms, ends.

=== By topic ===
==== Religion ====
- Roman restrictions on joining the clergy are initiated.

== Significant people ==
- Constantine the Great

== Births ==
320

- Aurelius Victor, Roman historian and politician (approximate date)
- Constans I, Roman emperor (d. 350)
- Flavian I, Patriarch of Antioch (d. 404)
- Jin Jianwendi, emperor of the Jin Dynasty (d. 372)
- Oribasius, Greek physician (approximate date)
- Tuoba Shiyiqian, prince of the Tuoba Dai (d. 376)
- Xie An, statesman of the Jin Dynasty (d. 385)

321

- Cheng of Jin (or Shigen), Chinese emperor (d. 342)
- Du Lingyang (or Chenggong), Chinese empress (d. 341)
- Valentinian I ("the Great"), Roman emperor (d. 375)

322

- Kang of Jin (or Shitong), Chinese emperor (d. 344)
- Xun Xian (or Lingze), Chinese general (d. 359)

323

- Constans I, Roman consul and emperor (d. 350)

324

- Chu Suanzi, Chinese empress of the Jin dynasty (d. 384)

325

- Wang Meng (or Jinglüe), Chinese prime minister (d. 375)

326

- Constantius Gallus, Roman consul and statesman (d. 354)
- Murong Chui (or Daoming), Chinese general (d. 396)
- Procopius, Roman general and usurper (executed 366) (approximate date)

327

- Urban of Langres, French bishop and saint
- Zhang Chonghua, Chinese ruler of Han-Zhao (d. 353)

328

- Flavius Julius Valens, Roman emperor (d. 378)
- Huan Chong, Chinese general and governor (d. 384)
- Yuan Hong, Chinese historian and politician (d. 376)

329

- Gregory Nazianzus, Greek Patriarch of Constantinople (d. 390)

== Deaths ==
320

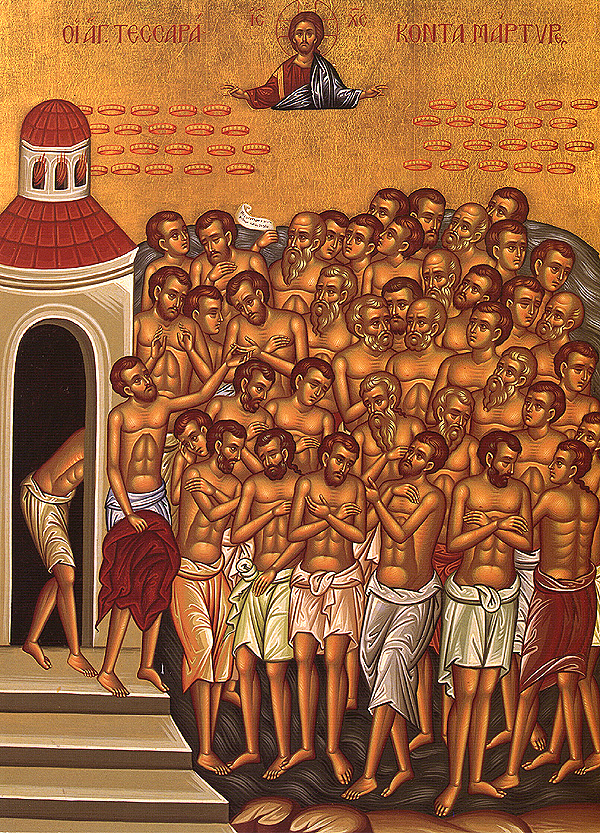
40 Martyrs of Sebaste

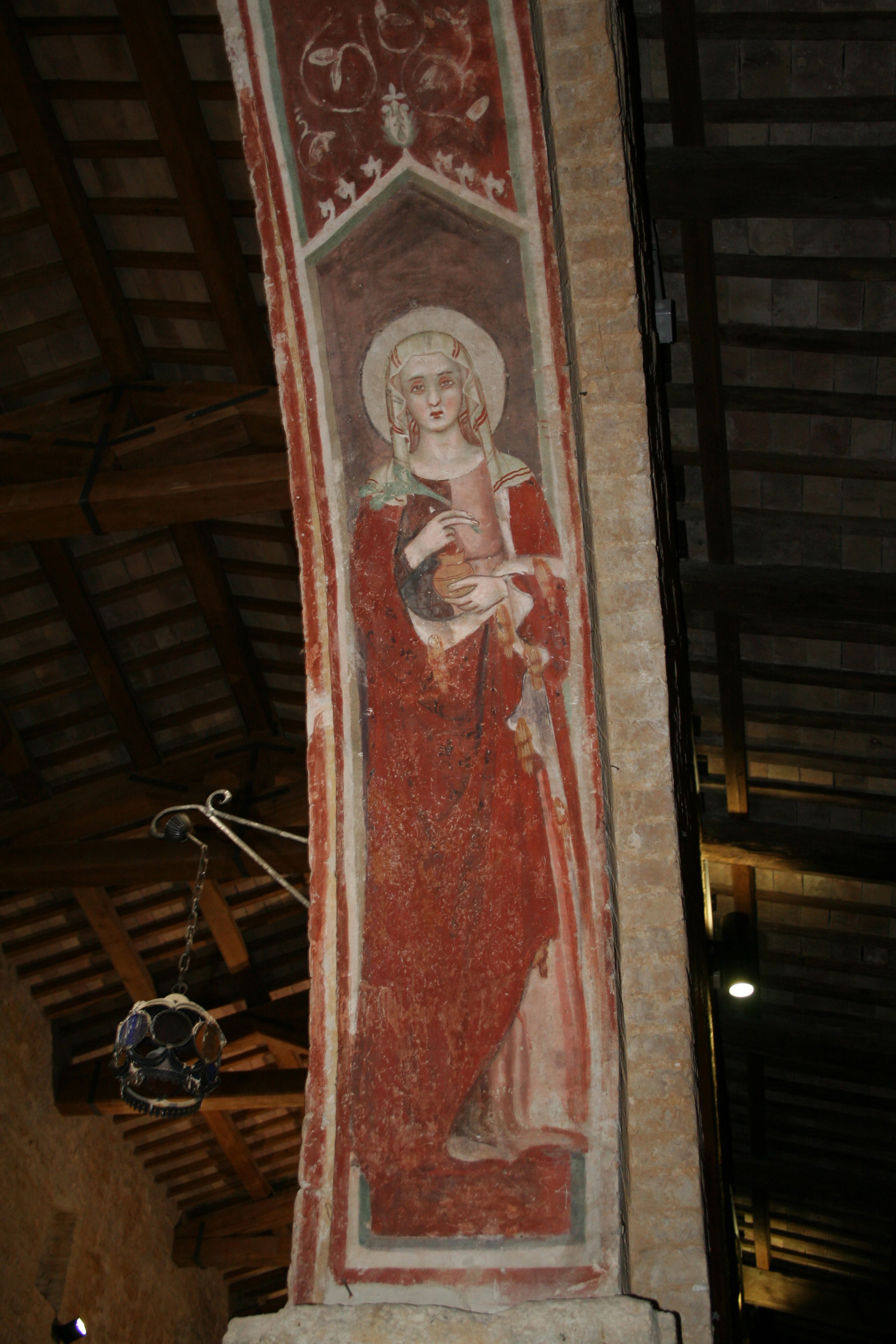
Saint Illuminata

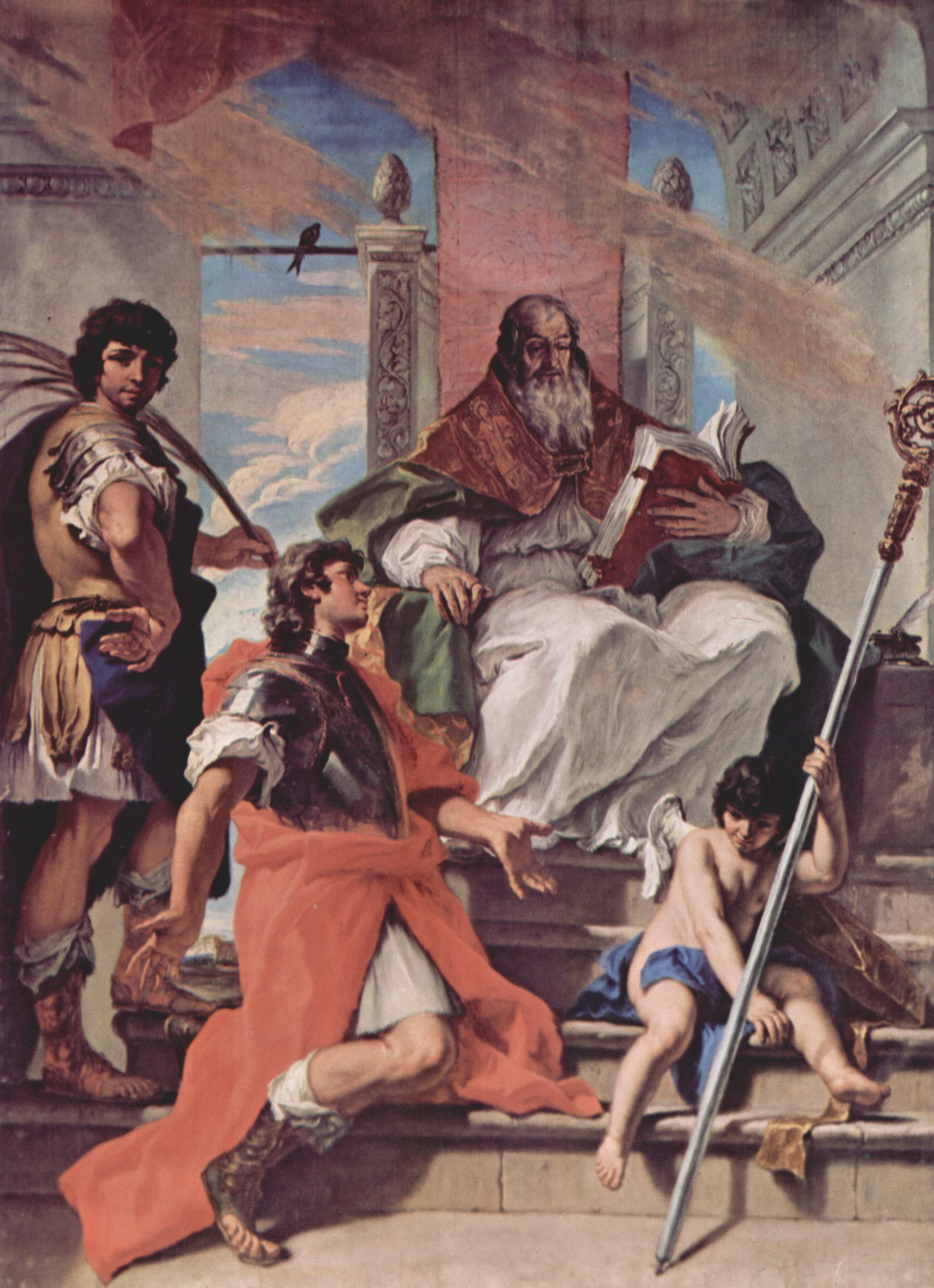
Saint Proculus of Verona

- January 2 – Narcissus, Argeus, and Marcellinus, Roman Catholic martyrs and saints
- January 29 – Valerius of Trèves, Roman Catholic priest and saint
- February 6 – Dorothea of Alexandria, Roman Catholic virgin, martyr and saint
- March 9 – 40 Martyrs of Sebaste
- March 10 – Cyrion and Candidus, Armenian Orthodox priest and saints
- July 11 – Januarius and Pelagia, Roman Catholic priests, martyrs and saints
- November 29 – Saint Illuminata, Roman Catholic religious sister and saint
- December 9 – Proculus of Verona, Roman Catholic priest and saint

=== Date unknown ===
- Lactantius, Christian writer (approximate date)
- Sima Bao, prince of the Jin Dynasty (b. 294)
- Zhang Shi, Duke of Xiping

321

- Tuoba Yulü, Chinese prince of the Tuoba Dai
- Zu Ti (or Shizhi), Chinese general and adviser (b. 266)

322

- Philogonius (or Filogonius), bishop of Antioch
- Rabbah bar Rav Huna, Jewish Talmudist
- Xu Kan, Chinese bandit leader and warlord
- Yang Xianrong, Chinese empress

323

- January 3 – Yuan of Jin (or Jingwen), Chinese emperor (b. 276)
- Tiberius Julius Rhadamsades, Roman prince and client king
- Zhang Bin (or Mengsun), Chinese general and strategist

324

- Guo Pu, Chinese historian, poet and writer (b. 276)
- Wang Dun (or Chuzhong), Chinese warlord (b. 266)
- Zhang Mao, Chinese ruler of Former Liang (b. 277)

325

- c. July – Li Ju (or Shihui), Chinese general and warlord
- October 18 – Ming of Jin, Chinese emperor (b. 299)
- Licinius, deposed Roman emperor (executed)
- Martinian, deposed Roman emperor (executed)
- Tuoba Heru, Chinese prince of the Tuoba Dai
- Approximate date – Iamblichus, Syrian philosopher and writer (b. 245)

326

- Flavius Julius Crispus, son of Constantine I (b. 303)
- Flavia Maxima Fausta, Roman empress (b. 289)
- Licinius II, Roman consul and caesar (b. 315)
- Liu (or Xianlie), Chinese empress of Han Zhao

327

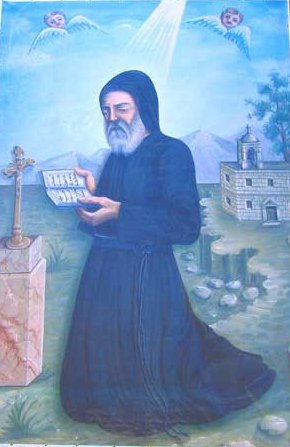
Saint Awtel

- June 3 – Awtel, Eastern Christian monk and saint
- Cleopatra, Christian martyr and saint (or 319)
- Jonas and Barachisius, Persian martyrs
- Melitius of Lycopolis, Christian bishop

328

- Alexander I, pope and patriarch of Alexandria
- Papa (or Papa bar Aggai), Sassanid bishop
- Su Jun, Chinese general and politician
- Yu Wenjun, Chinese empress (b. 297)

329

- Han Huang, Chinese general and rebel
- Liu Xi, Chinese emperor of Han-Zhao
- Liu Yao, Chinese emperor of Han-Zhao
- Liu Yin, Chinese prince of Han-Zhao
- Wen Jiao, Chinese general and governor
