= 4th century =

One hundred years, from 301 to 400

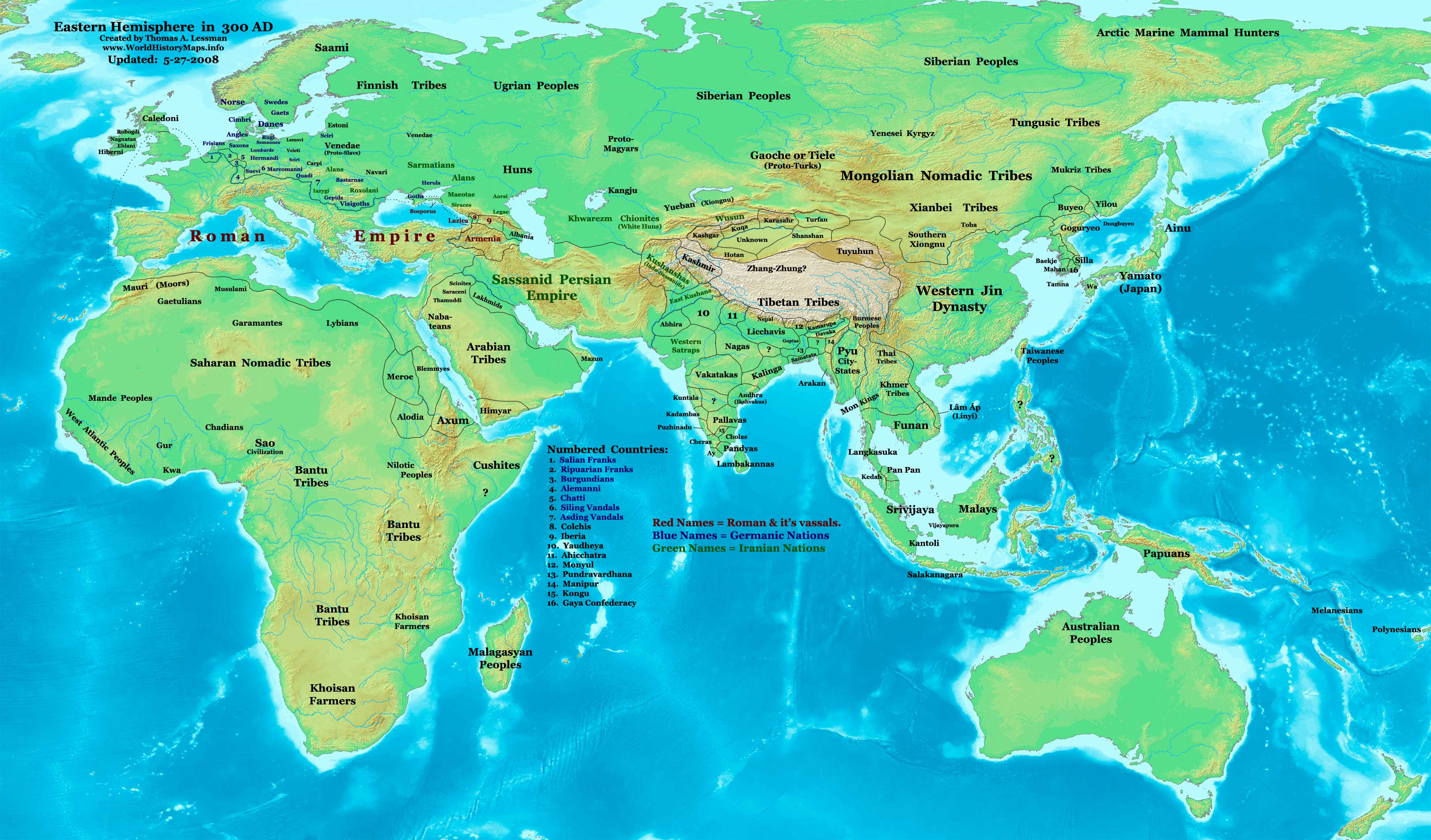
Eastern Hemisphere at the beginning of the 4th century AD.

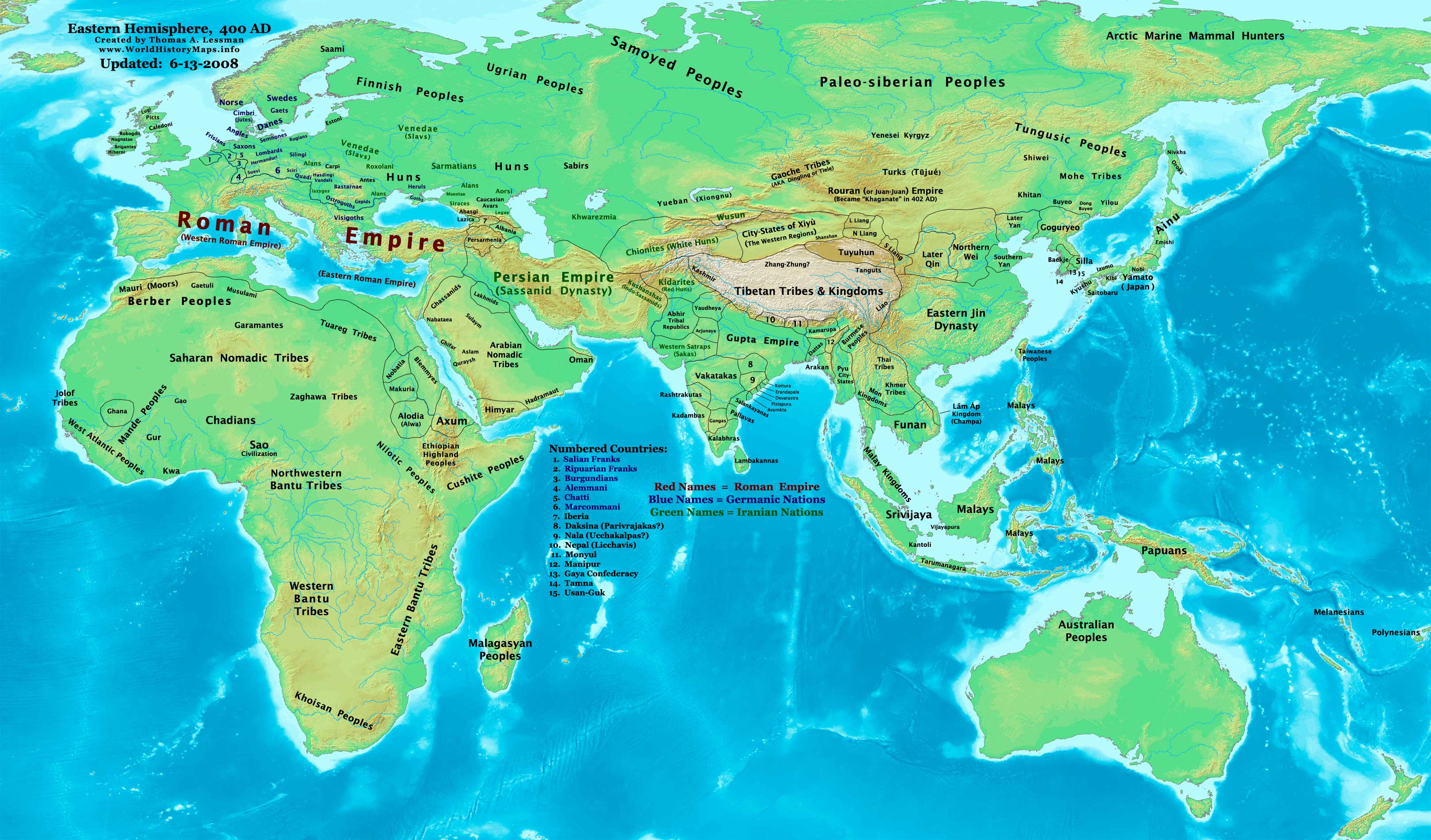
Eastern Hemisphere at the end of the 4th century AD.

The 4th century was the time period from 301 AD (represented by the Roman numerals CCCI) to 400 AD (CD) in accordance with the Julian calendar. In the West, the early part of the century was shaped by Constantine the Great, who became the first Roman emperor to adopt Christianity. Gaining sole reign of the empire, he is also noted for re-establishing a single imperial capital, choosing the site of ancient Byzantium in 330 (over the current capitals, which had effectively been changed by Diocletian's reforms to Milan in the West, and Nicomedeia in the East) to build the city soon called Nova Roma (New Rome); it was later renamed Constantinople in his honor.

The last emperor to control both the eastern and western halves of the empire was Theodosius I. As the century progressed after his death, it became increasingly apparent that the empire had changed in many ways since the time of Augustus. The two-emperor system originally established by Diocletian in the previous century fell into regular practice, and the east continued to grow in importance as a centre of trade and imperial power, while Rome itself diminished greatly in importance due to its location far from potential trouble spots, like Central Europe and the East. Late in the century Christianity became the official state religion, and the empire's old pagan culture began to disappear. General prosperity was felt throughout this period, but recurring invasions by Germanic tribes plagued the empire from 376 AD onward. These early invasions marked the beginning of the end for the Western Roman Empire.

In China, the Jin dynasty, which had united the nation prior in 280, began rapidly facing trouble by the start of the century due to political infighting, which led to the insurrections of the northern barbarian tribes (starting the Sixteen Kingdoms period), which quickly overwhelmed the empire, forcing the Jin court to retreat and entrench itself in the south past the Yangtze river, starting what is known as the Eastern Jin dynasty around 317. Towards the end of the century, Emperor of the Former Qin, Fu Jiān, united the north under his banner, and planned to conquer the Jin dynasty in the south, so as to finally reunite the land, but was decisively defeated at the Battle of Fei River in 383, causing massive unrest and civil war in his empire, thereby leading to the fall of the Former Qin, and the continued existence of the Eastern Jin dynasty.

According to archaeologists, sufficient archaeological evidence correlates of state-level societies coalesced in the 4th century to show the existence in Korea of the Three Kingdoms (300/400–668 AD) of Baekje, Goguryeo, and Silla.

== Long Fourth Century ==
Historians of the Roman Empire refer to the "Long Fourth Century" to the period spanning the fourth century proper but starting earlier with the accession of the Emperor Diocletian in 284 and ending later with the death of Honorius in 423 or of Theodosius II in 450.

== Events ==
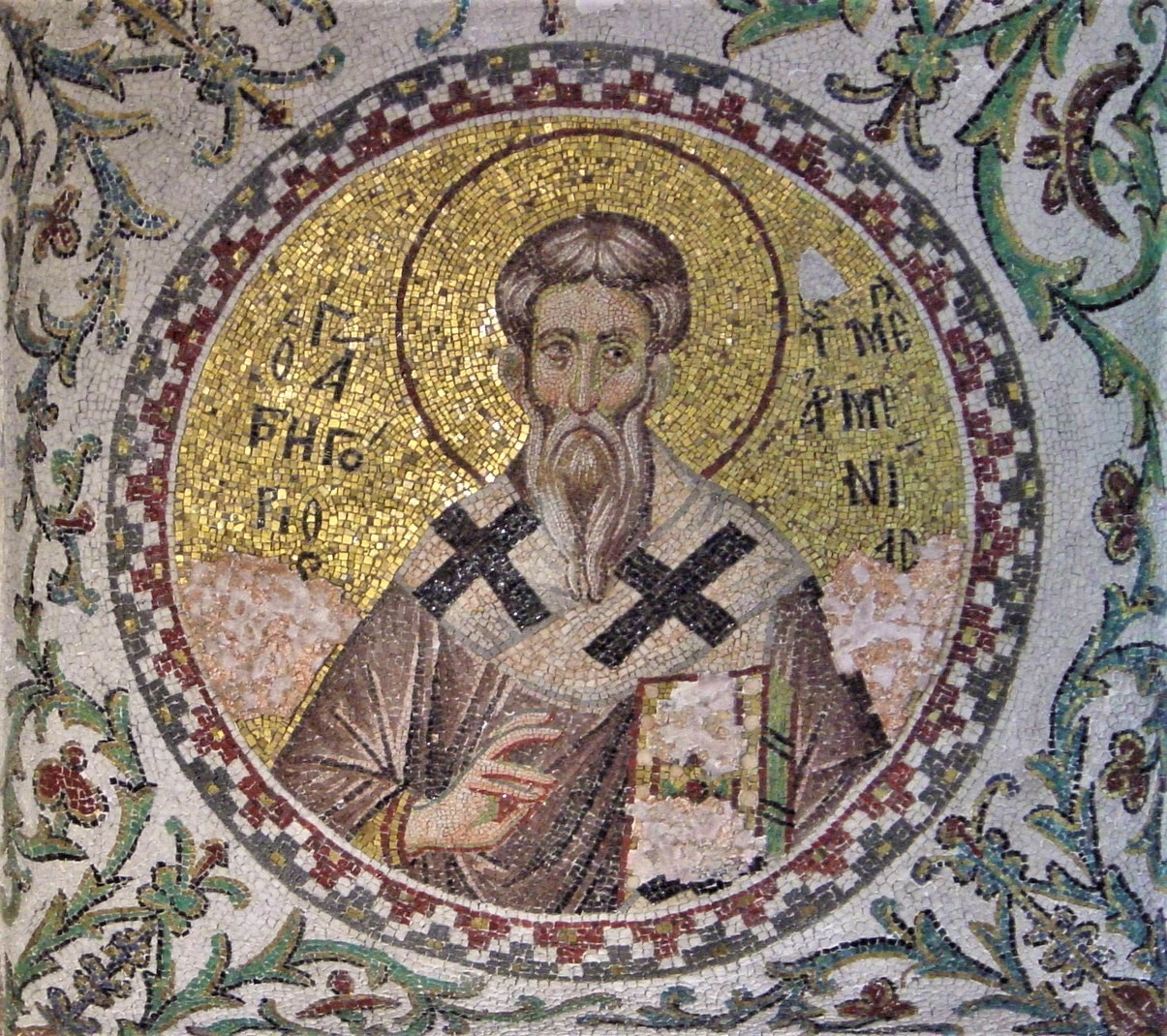
Gregory the Illuminator mosaic, converted Armenia from Zoroastrianism to Christianity

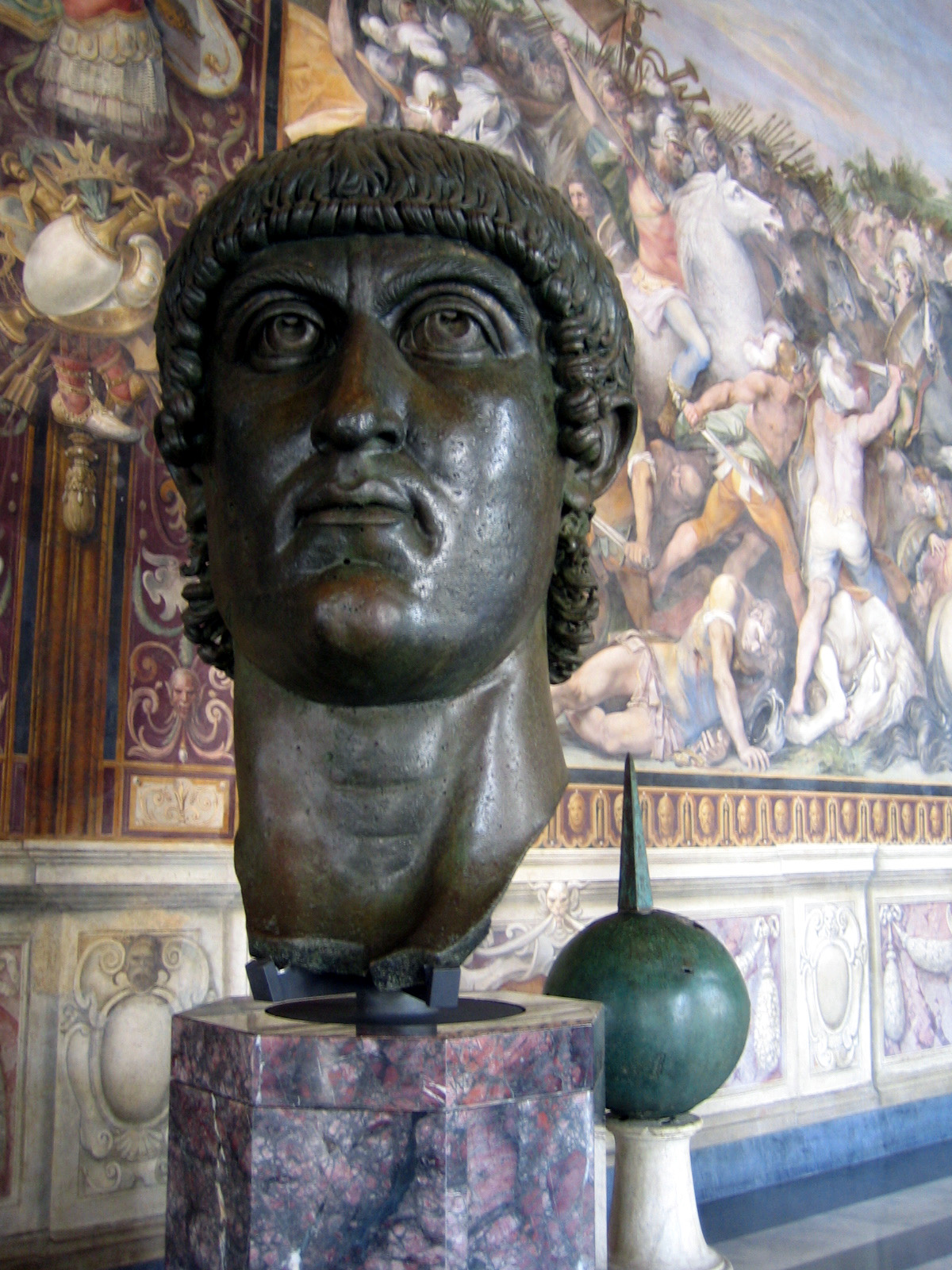
Contemporary bronze head of Constantine I (r. 306–337 AD)

- Early 4th century – Former audience hall now known as the Basilica, Trier, Germany, is built.
- Early 4th century – The Gupta Empire is established.
- 301: Armenia first to adopt Christianity as state religion.
- 304–439: The Sixteen Kingdoms in China begins.
- 306–337: Constantine the Great, ends persecution of Christians in the Roman Empire (see also Constantinian shift) and Constantinople becomes new seat of government (New Rome).

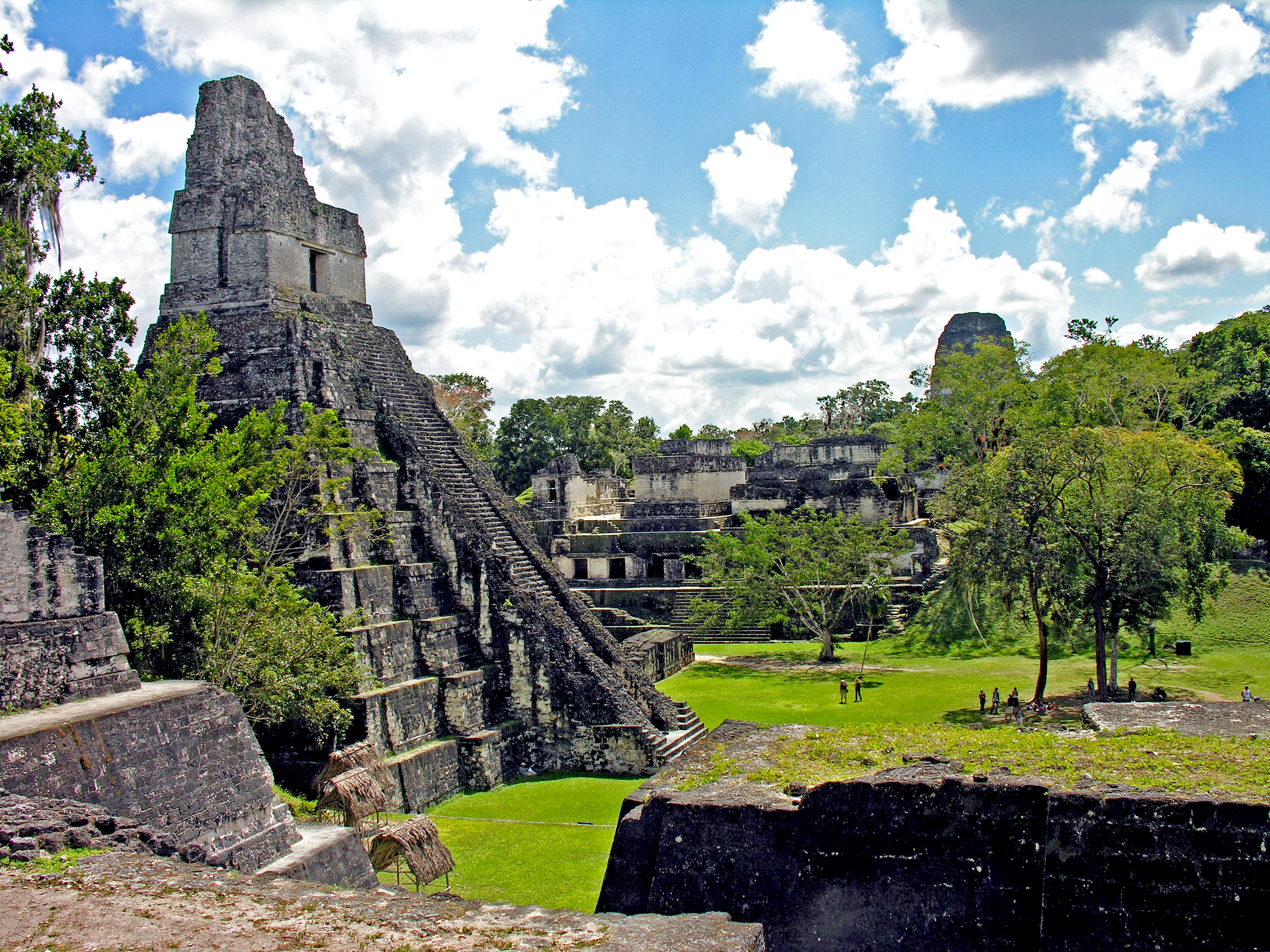
Tikal had a population of about 100,000 when it was conquered by Teotihuacan, less than a fourth of its peak population

- 320: Butuan Boat One, the oldest known Balangay, a multi-purpose ship native to the Philippines is built.
- 325–328: The Kingdom of Aksum adopts Christianity.
- 325: Constantine the Great calls the First Council of Nicaea to pacify Christianity in the grip of the Arian controversy.
- 335–380: Samudragupta expands the Gupta Empire.
- 337: Constantine the Great is baptized a Christian on his death bed.
- 350: About this time the Kingdom of Aksum conquers the Kingdom of Kush.
- 350–400: At some time during this period, the Huns began to attack the Sassanid Empire.
- 350: The Kutai Martadipura kingdom in eastern Borneo produced the earliest known stone inscriptions in Indonesia known as the Mulavarman inscription written in the Sanskrit language using Pallava scripture.
- Mid-4th century – Dish, from Mildenhall, England, is made. It is now kept at the British Museum, London.
- Mid-4th century – Wang Xizhi makes a portion of a letter from the Feng Ju album. Six Dynasties period. It is now kept at National Palace Museum, Taipei, Taiwan, Republic of China.
- 365: An earthquake with a magnitude of at least eight strikes the Eastern Mediterranean. The following tsunami causes widespread destruction in Crete, Greece, Libya, Egypt, Cyprus, and Sicily.
- 376: Visigoths appear on the Danube and are allowed entry into the Roman Empire in their flight from the Huns.
- 378: Battle of Adrianople: Roman army is defeated by the Visigoth cavalry. Emperor Valens is killed.
- 378–395: Theodosius I, Roman emperor, bans pagan worship, Christianity is made the official religion of the Empire.
- 378: Siyaj K'ak' conquers Waka on (January 8), Tikal (January 16) and Uaxactun.
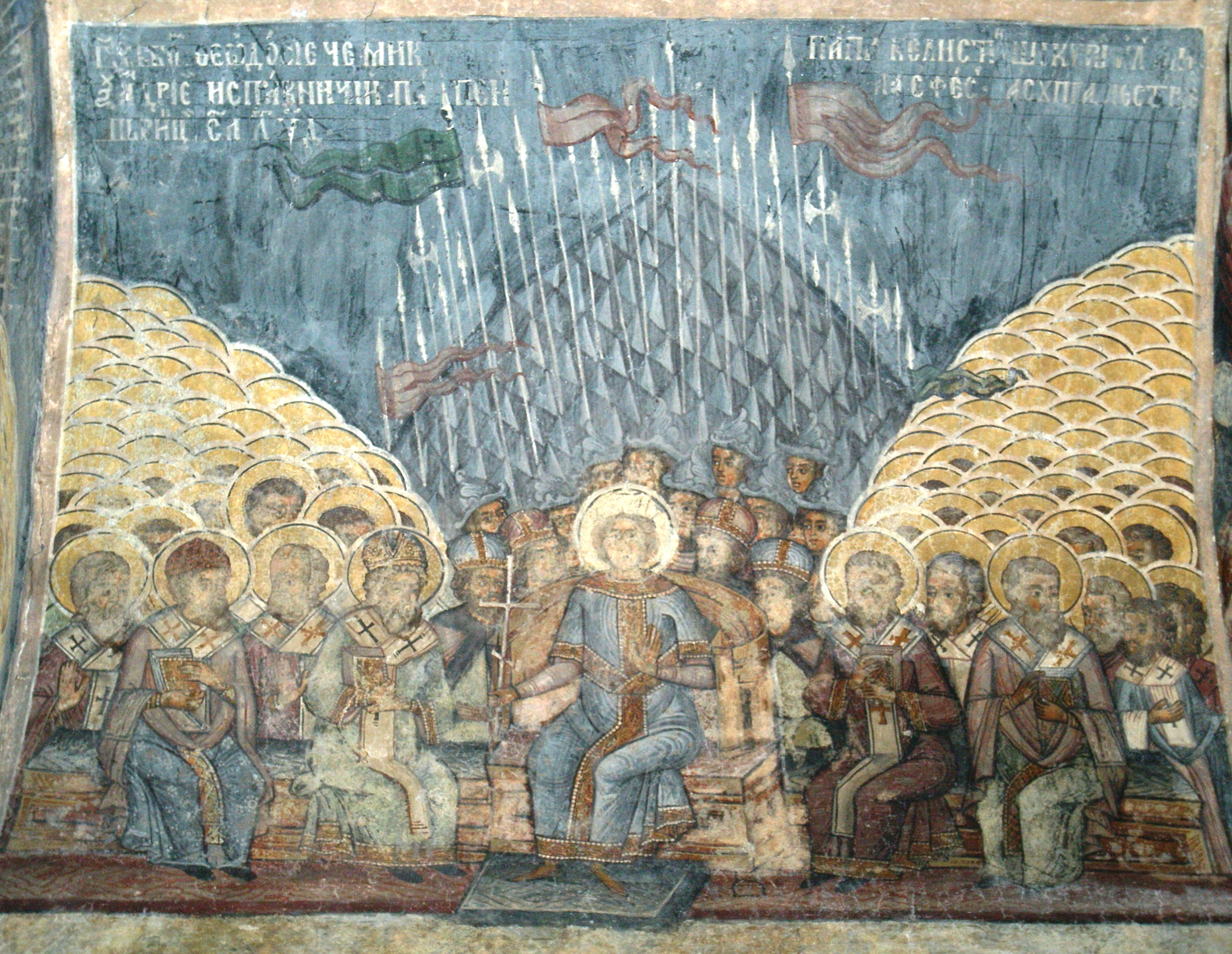
  Wall painting of the Council of Constantinople (381) in the Stavropoleos monastery, Romania
- 381: First Council of Constantinople reaffirms the Christian doctrine of the Trinity by adding to the creed of Nicaea.
- 383: Battle of Fei River in China.
- 395: The Battle of Canhe Slope occurs.
- 395: Roman emperor Theodosius I dies, causing the Roman Empire to split permanently.
- Late 4th century: Cubiculum of Leonis, Catacomb of Commodilla, near Rome, is made.
- Late 4th century: Atrium added in the Old St. Peter's Basilica, Rome.

== Inventions, discoveries, introductions ==
- The Stirrup was invented in China, no later than 322.
- Kama Sutra, dated between c. 400 BC to c. 300 AD.
- Iron pillar of Delhi, India is the world's first Iron Pillar.
- Trigonometric functions: The trigonometric functions sine and versine originated in Indian astronomy.
- Codex Sinaiticus and the Codex Vaticanus Graecus 1209, are the earliest Christian bibles.
- Book of Steps, Syriac religious discourses.
