= 320 =

320 in various calendars
Gregorian calendar	320; CCCXX
Ab urbe condita	1073
Assyrian calendar	5070
Balinese saka calendar	241–242
Bengali calendar	−274 – −273
Berber calendar	1270
Buddhist calendar	864
Burmese calendar	−318
Byzantine calendar	5828–5829
Chinese calendar	己卯年 (Earth Rabbit); 3017 or 2810 — to — 庚辰年 (Metal Dragon); 3018 or 2811
Coptic calendar	36–37
Discordian calendar	1486
Ethiopian calendar	312–313
Hebrew calendar	4080–4081
- Hindu calendars
Vikram Samvat	376–377
Shaka Samvat	241–242
Kali Yuga	3420–3421
Holocene calendar	10320
Iranian calendar	302 BP – 301 BP
Islamic calendar	311 BH – 310 BH
Javanese calendar	201–202
Julian calendar	320; CCCXX
Korean calendar	2653
Minguo calendar	1592 before ROC 民前1592年
Nanakshahi calendar	−1148
Seleucid era	631/632 AG
Thai solar calendar	862–863
Tibetan calendar	ས་མོ་ཡོས་ལོ་ (female Earth-Hare); 446 or 65 or −707 — to — ལྕགས་ཕོ་འབྲུག་ལོ་ (male Iron-Dragon); 447 or 66 or −706

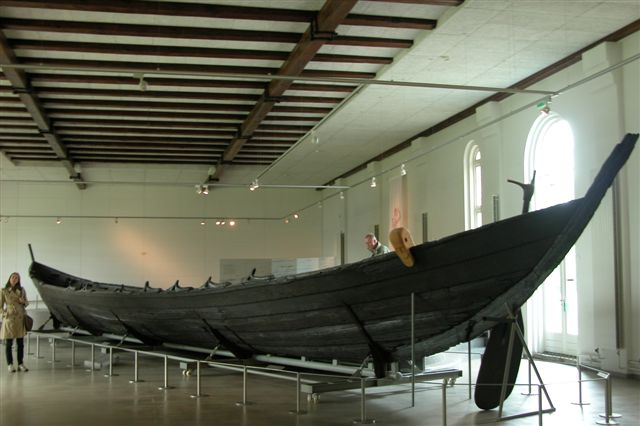
The Nydam oak boat at Gottorf Castle, Schleswig (Germany)

Year 320 (CCCXX) was a leap year starting on Friday of the Julian calendar.

At the time, it was known as the Year of the Consulship of Constantinus and Constantinus (or, less frequently, year 1073 Ab urbe condita). The denomination 320 for this year has been used since the early medieval period, when the Anno Domini calendar era became the prevalent method in Europe for naming years.

== Events ==
=== By place ===
==== Roman Empire ====
- Crispus, eldest son of Constantine I, leads a victorious campaign against the Franks, assuring twenty years of peace along the Rhine frontier. He establishes his residence in Augusta Treverorum (modern Trier), capital of Germania.
- Licinius reneges on the religious freedom promised by the Edict of Milan, and begins a new persecution of Christians in the Eastern Roman Empire. He imprisons Christians, confiscates their properties and destroys churches.

==== Asia ====
- King Chandragupta I founds the Gupta dynasty in northern India (approximate date).
- Zhang Shi (張寔), Zhang Duke of Xiping and governor of Liang Province, (涼州)is assassinated by Yan She (閻涉) and Zhao Ang (趙卬) and replaced by Zhang Mao (張茂), commonly accepted first ruler of the Chinese state Former Liang.

=== By topic ===
==== Art ====
- Construction begins on the Old St. Peter's Basilica, Rome (approximate date).

==== Culture and Religion ====
- In Nydam Mose (Denmark), the Nydam oak boat is sacrificed by the Danes (the boat is excavated in the 1830s, when a local farmer finds weapons, including swords and spears).

==== Science ====
- October 18 – Pappus of Alexandria, Greek philosopher, observes an eclipse of the sun and writes a commentary on The Great Astronomer (Almagest).

== Births ==
- Aurelius Victor, Roman historian and politician (approximate date)
- Constans I, Roman emperor (d. 350)
- Flavian I, Patriarch of Antioch (d. 404)
- Jin Jianwendi, emperor of the Jin Dynasty (d. 372)
- Oribasius, Greek physician (approximate date)
- Tuoba Shiyiqian, prince of the Tuoba Dai (d. 376)
- Xie An, statesman of the Jin Dynasty (d. 385)

== Deaths ==
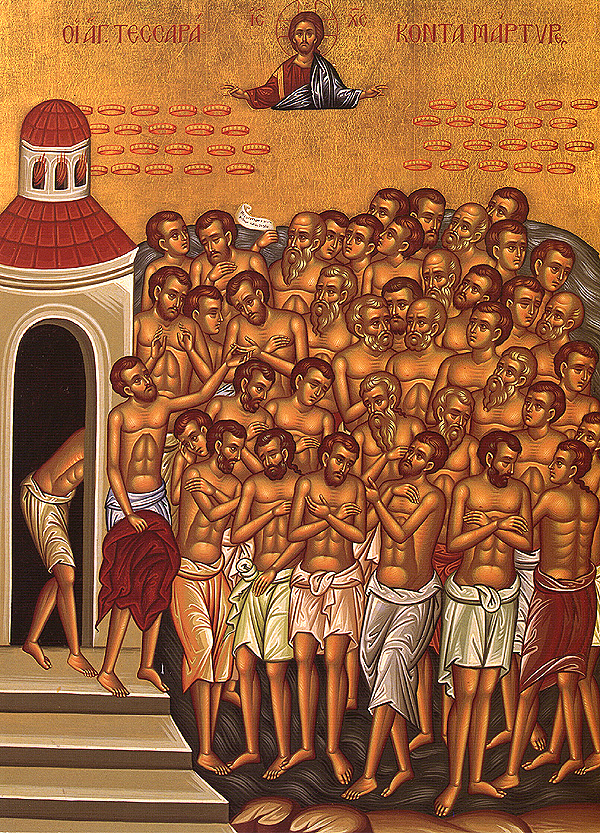
40 Martyrs of Sebaste

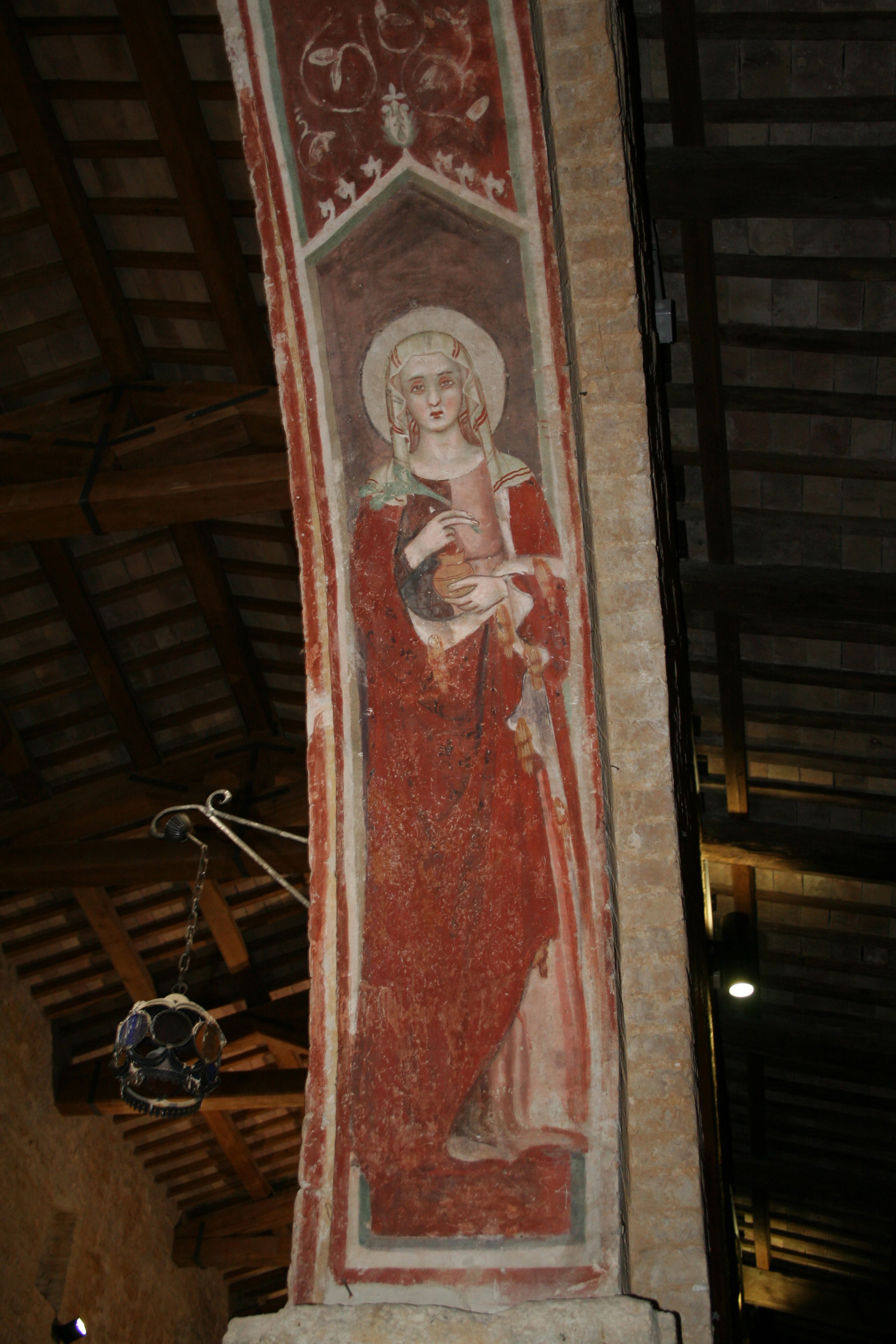
Saint Illuminata

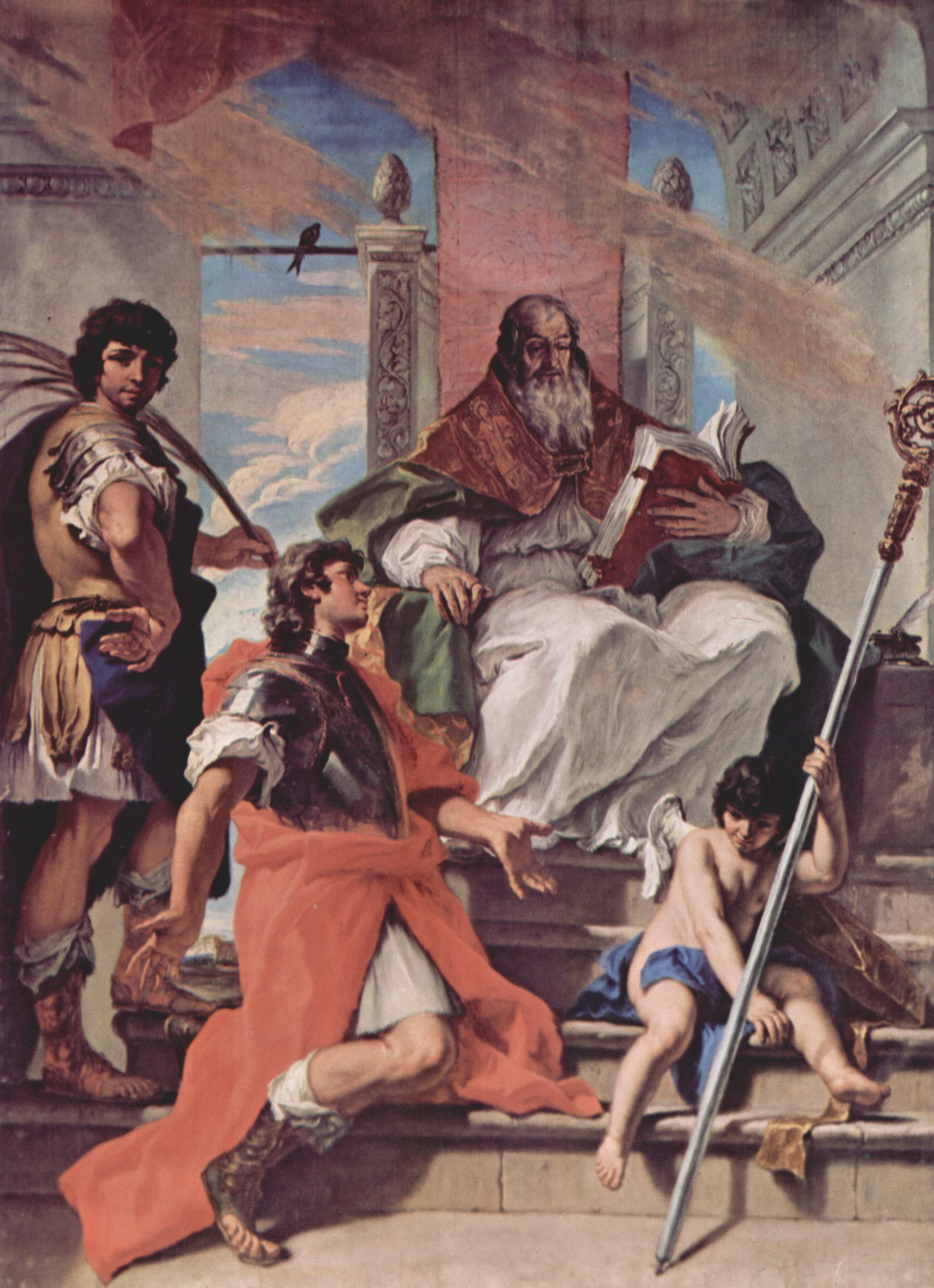
Saint Proculus of Verona

- January 2 – Narcissus, Argeus, and Marcellinus, Roman Catholic martyrs and saints
- January 29 – Valerius of Trèves, Roman Catholic priest and saint
- February 6 – Dorothea of Alexandria, Roman Catholic virgin, martyr and saint
- March 9 – 40 Martyrs of Sebaste
- March 10 – Cyrion and Candidus, Armenian Orthodox priest and saints
- July 11 – Januarius and Pelagia, Roman Catholic priests, martyrs and saints
- November 29 – Saint Illuminata, Roman Catholic religious sister and saint
- December 9 – Proculus of Verona, Roman Catholic priest and saint

=== Date unknown ===
- Lactantius, Christian writer (approximate date)
- Sima Bao, prince of the Jin Dynasty (b. 294)
- Zhang Shi, Duke of Xiping
