= 385 =

385 in various calendars
Gregorian calendar	385; CCCLXXXV
Ab urbe condita	1138
Assyrian calendar	5135
Balinese saka calendar	306–307
Bengali calendar	−209 – −208
Berber calendar	1335
Buddhist calendar	929
Burmese calendar	−253
Byzantine calendar	5893–5894
Chinese calendar	甲申年 (Wood Monkey); 3082 or 2875 — to — 乙酉年 (Wood Rooster); 3083 or 2876
Coptic calendar	101–102
Discordian calendar	1551
Ethiopian calendar	377–378
Hebrew calendar	4145–4146
- Hindu calendars
Vikram Samvat	441–442
Shaka Samvat	306–307
Kali Yuga	3485–3486
Holocene calendar	10385
Iranian calendar	237 BP – 236 BP
Islamic calendar	244 BH – 243 BH
Javanese calendar	268–269
Julian calendar	385; CCCLXXXV
Korean calendar	2718
Minguo calendar	1527 before ROC 民前1527年
Nanakshahi calendar	−1083
Seleucid era	696/697 AG
Thai solar calendar	927–928
Tibetan calendar	阳木猴年 (male Wood-Monkey); 511 or 130 or −642 — to — 阴木鸡年 (female Wood-Rooster); 512 or 131 or −641

Year 385 (CCCLXXXV) was a common year starting on Wednesday of the Julian calendar. At the time, it was known as the Year of the Consulship of Augustus and Bauto (or, less frequently, year 1138 Ab urbe condita). The denomination 385 for this year has been used since the early medieval period, when the Anno Domini calendar era became the prevalent method in Europe for naming years.

== Events ==
=== By place ===
==== Roman Empire ====
- The Roman synod exiles the prophet Jerome, who has incorporated ideas first propounded by the Roman statesman Cicero. He departs for Egypt, Bethlehem, and Jerusalem, accompanied by the Christian ascetic Paula, who will edit Jerome's translation of the Bible, which becomes the Latin Vulgate.

==== Asia ====
- Jinsa of Baekje becomes the 16th king of the ancient Korean kingdom of Baekje.

=== By topic ===
==== Arts and Sciences ====
- Ammianus Marcellinus begins writing a history, in the style of Tacitus, covering the years AD 96–378.

==== Religion ====
- The Serapeum of Alexandria, one of the largest Greek temples in Egypt, is destroyed by a Christian mob. The precise date is disputed, with 391 sometimes given as the moment of final destruction.
- Theophilus becomes Patriarch of Alexandria.
- Pope Siricius issues the Directa Decretal, proclaiming the primacy of Rome and the priestly obligation of celibacy.
- Priscillian, Spanish bishop, is accused of Manichaeism and magic, and beheaded at Trier . He becomes the first person in the history of Christianity to be executed for heresy.

==== Sport in the Roman Empire ====
- Aurelios Zopyros becomes the last reported athlete at the Ancient Olympic Games. He is a victor in "junior boxing" (pankration).

== Births ==
- Avitus, Western Roman Emperor (approximate date)
- Murong Chao, emperor of the Xianbei state Southern Yan (d. 410)
- Murong Xi, emperor of the Xianbei state Later Yan (d. 407)
- Pulcheria, daughter of Theodosius I who died in infancy (d. 386)
- Saint Patrick, missionary in Ireland (approximate date)
- Paulus Orosius, historian and theologian (approximate date)
- Xie Lingyun, Chinese poet of the Southern and Northern Dynasties (d. 433)

== Deaths ==
- October 16 – Fú Jiān, emperor of the Chinese Di state Former Qin (b. 337)
- Aelia Flaccilla, Roman empress and wife of Theodosius I (or possibly 386)
- Chimnyu, king of Baekje (Korea)
- Dao An, Buddhist monk of the Jin Dynasty (b. 312)
- Murong Wei, emperor of the Xianbei state Former Yan (b. 350)
- Priscillian, Spanish bishop and theologian
- Xie An, statesman of the Jin Dynasty (b. 320)
