= 323 (disambiguation) =

323 may refer to:

- The year 323 BC
- The year 323 AD
- The number 323
- Area code 323, a NANP area code that serves Los Angeles, California and its surrounding areas
- 323 Brucia, an asteroid
- Mazda 323, the widely used alternative name of the Mazda Familia motorcar
- British Rail Class 323, an electric train
