= 323 =

323 in various calendars
Gregorian calendar	323; CCCXXIII
Ab urbe condita	1076
Assyrian calendar	5073
Balinese saka calendar	244–245
Bengali calendar	−271 – −270
Berber calendar	1273
Buddhist calendar	867
Burmese calendar	−315
Byzantine calendar	5831–5832
Chinese calendar	壬午年 (Water Horse); 3020 or 2813 — to — 癸未年 (Water Goat); 3021 or 2814
Coptic calendar	39–40
Discordian calendar	1489
Ethiopian calendar	315–316
Hebrew calendar	4083–4084
- Hindu calendars
Vikram Samvat	379–380
Shaka Samvat	244–245
Kali Yuga	3423–3424
Holocene calendar	10323
Iranian calendar	299 BP – 298 BP
Islamic calendar	308 BH – 307 BH
Javanese calendar	204–205
Julian calendar	323; CCCXXIII
Korean calendar	2656
Minguo calendar	1589 before ROC 民前1589年
Nanakshahi calendar	−1145
Seleucid era	634/635 AG
Thai solar calendar	865–866
Tibetan calendar	ཆུ་ཕོ་རྟ་ལོ་ (male Water-Horse); 449 or 68 or −704 — to — ཆུ་མོ་ལུག་ལོ་ (female Water-Sheep); 450 or 69 or −703

Year 323 (CCCXXIII) was a common year starting on Tuesday of the Julian calendar. At the time, it was known as the Year of the Consulship of Severus and Rufinus (or, less frequently, year 1076 Ab urbe condita) in Europe. The denomination 323 for this year has been used since the early medieval period, when the Anno Domini calendar era became the prevalent method in Europe for naming years.

== Events ==
=== By place ===
==== Roman Empire ====
- Emperor Constantine the Great defeats the invading Goths and Sarmatians north of the Danube in Dacia, and claims the title of Sarmaticus Maximus.

==== China ====
- Crown Prince Ming of Jin succeeds his father Yuan of Jin as emperor of the Eastern Jin Dynasty.

=== By topic ===
==== Religion ====
- The poetic work Banquet (Thalia) by the Libyan-born Egyptian Christian priest Arius, age 73, expresses the doctrine that Jesus of Nazareth was not of the same substance as God but rather had a finite nature. As an ascetic, he leads a Christian community near Alexandria, and comes under suspicion of heresy. Arius writes to his former schoolmate Eusebius, bishop of Nicomedia, asking for support. Eusebius writes to other bishops, and when Arius is condemned in September, Eusebius gives him safe haven, and sponsors a synod at Bithynia in October, which nullifies Arius's excommunication (see Council of Nicaea).

== Births ==
- Constans I, Roman consul and emperor (d. 350)

== Deaths ==
- January 3 – Yuan of Jin (or Jingwen), Chinese emperor (b. 276)
- Tiberius Julius Rhadamsades, Roman prince and client king
- Zhang Bin (or Mengsun), Chinese general and strategist
