= 294 =

294 in various calendars
Gregorian calendar	294; CCXCIV
Ab urbe condita	1047
Assyrian calendar	5044
Balinese saka calendar	215–216
Bengali calendar	−300 – −299
Berber calendar	1244
Buddhist calendar	838
Burmese calendar	−344
Byzantine calendar	5802–5803
Chinese calendar	癸丑年 (Water Ox); 2991 or 2784 — to — 甲寅年 (Wood Tiger); 2992 or 2785
Coptic calendar	10–11
Discordian calendar	1460
Ethiopian calendar	286–287
Hebrew calendar	4054–4055
- Hindu calendars
Vikram Samvat	350–351
Shaka Samvat	215–216
Kali Yuga	3394–3395
Holocene calendar	10294
Iranian calendar	328 BP – 327 BP
Islamic calendar	338 BH – 337 BH
Javanese calendar	174–175
Julian calendar	294; CCXCIV
Korean calendar	2627
Minguo calendar	1618 before ROC 民前1618年
Nanakshahi calendar	−1174
Seleucid era	605/606 AG
Thai solar calendar	836–837
Tibetan calendar	ཆུ་མོ་གླང་ལོ་ (female Water-Ox); 420 or 39 or −733 — to — ཤིང་ཕོ་སྟག་ལོ་ (male Wood-Tiger); 421 or 40 or −732

Year 294 (CCXCIV) was a common year starting on Monday of the Julian calendar. At the time, it was known as the Year of the Consulship of Constantius and (Galerius) Maximianus (or, less frequently, year 1047 Ab urbe condita). The denomination 294 for this year has been used since the early medieval period, when the Anno Domini calendar era became the prevalent method in Europe for naming years.

== Events ==
=== By place ===
==== Asia ====
- Tuoba Luguan succeeds his nephew Tuoba Fu, as chieftain of the Chinese Tuoba clan.

== Births ==
- Sima Bao, Chinese prince of the Jin Dynasty (d. 320)

== Deaths ==
- Tuoba Fu, chieftain of the Chinese Tuoba clan
