= Aurelios Zopyros =

Ancient Greek boxer

Aurelios Zopyros of Athens (Greek: Αὐρήλιος Ζώπυρος) is the last reported athlete at the Ancient Olympic Games before the banning by Theodosius I in AD 393. He was victor in "junior boxing" in 385. His brother Eukarpidês was also an Olympic pankratiast winner in 381.
