= 276 =

276 in various calendars
Gregorian calendar	276; CCLXXVI
Ab urbe condita	1029
Assyrian calendar	5026
Balinese saka calendar	197–198
Bengali calendar	−318 – −317
Berber calendar	1226
Buddhist calendar	820
Burmese calendar	−362
Byzantine calendar	5784–5785
Chinese calendar	乙未年 (Wood Goat); 2973 or 2766 — to — 丙申年 (Fire Monkey); 2974 or 2767
Coptic calendar	−8 – −7
Discordian calendar	1442
Ethiopian calendar	268–269
Hebrew calendar	4036–4037
- Hindu calendars
Vikram Samvat	332–333
Shaka Samvat	197–198
Kali Yuga	3376–3377
Holocene calendar	10276
Iranian calendar	346 BP – 345 BP
Islamic calendar	357 BH – 356 BH
Javanese calendar	155–156
Julian calendar	276; CCLXXVI
Korean calendar	2609
Minguo calendar	1636 before ROC 民前1636年
Nanakshahi calendar	−1192
Seleucid era	587/588 AG
Thai solar calendar	818–819
Tibetan calendar	阴木羊年 (female Wood-Goat); 402 or 21 or −751 — to — 阳火猴年 (male Fire-Monkey); 403 or 22 or −750

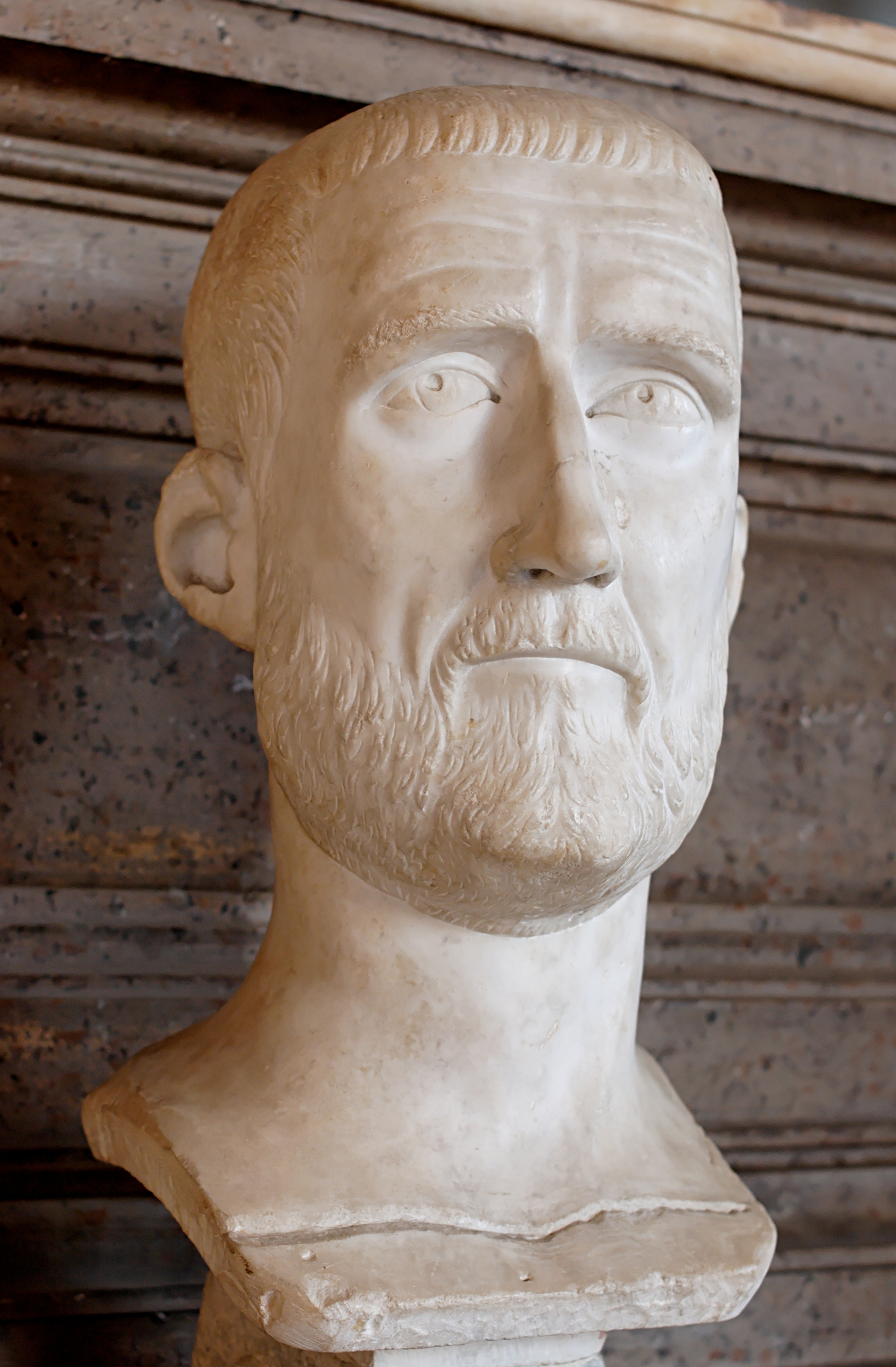
Emperor Probus (232–282)

Year 276 (CCLXXVI) was a leap year starting on Saturday of the Julian calendar. At the time, it was known as the Year of the Consulship of Tacitus and Aemilianus (or, less frequently, year 1029 Ab urbe condita). The denomination 276 for this year has been used since the early medieval period, when the Anno Domini calendar era became the prevalent method in Europe for naming years.

== Events ==
=== By place ===
==== Roman Empire ====
- Emperor Tacitus doubles the silver content of the aurelianianus, and halves its tariffing to 2.5 d.c. They carry the value marks X.I.
- Tacitus campaigns successfully against the Goths who have invaded Asia Minor, and his half-brother, the praetorian prefect Marcus Annius Florianus, continues the campaign.
- Tacitus' cousin Maximinus administers Syria in a harsh manner, and is assassinated by local men of power, who are joined in the conspiracy by the faction responsible for having assassinated Aurelian in the previous year.
- Tacitus dies in Tyana, Cappadocia. He either dies of illness, or is murdered by the faction responsible for having assassinated Aurelian and Maximinus.
- Florianus becomes Roman Emperor with the support of the Senate, but a general in the east, Marcus Aurelius Probus, usurps power against him. Florianus breaks off his campaign against the Goths and marches east from the Bosporus with support from the Roman legions in Britain, Gaul, Spain and Italy.
- Florianus holds power for some weeks and fights indecisively against Probus in Cilicia, but his soldiers, many of whom are from the colder Rhine and Danube frontiers, suffer from heat and disease. He is overthrown and then assassinated by his own troops near Tarsus (Turkey), in collusion with Probus. Probus, age 44, is proclaimed new Emperor of Rome.
- Probus returns the aurelianianus to the tariffing of Aurelian.
- Probus invites the faction responsible for the murders of Aurelian and Tacitus to a banquet, only to massacre them. He then arrests a surviving conspirator and has him burned alive.

==== Sassanid Empire ====
- King Bahram I of Persia dies after a 3-year reign, in which the Zoroastrian priests at Ctesiphon (Iran) put pressure on him to persecute Buddhists, Christians, and Manichaeans. He is succeeded by his son Bahram II.

==== Asia ====
- Mahasena reigns in Ceylon. Orthodox and unpopular, he tries to introduce Mahayana Buddhism to the country.

== Births ==
- Gregory the Elder, bishop of Nazianzus (approximate date)
- Guo Pu, Chinese historian, poet and writer (d. 324)
- Wang Dao, Chinese politician and statesman (d. 339)
- Yuan of Jin, Chinese emperor of the Jin Dynasty (d. 323)

== Deaths ==
- Bahram I, king of the Sassanid Empire
- Marcus Annius Florianus, Roman emperor
- Marcus Claudius Tacitus, Roman Emperor
- Tiberius Julius Synges, Roman client king
