= 372 =

372 in various calendars
Gregorian calendar	372; CCCLXXII
Ab urbe condita	1125
Assyrian calendar	5122
Balinese saka calendar	293–294
Bengali calendar	−222 – −221
Berber calendar	1322
Buddhist calendar	916
Burmese calendar	−266
Byzantine calendar	5880–5881
Chinese calendar	辛未年 (Metal Goat); 3069 or 2862 — to — 壬申年 (Water Monkey); 3070 or 2863
Coptic calendar	88–89
Discordian calendar	1538
Ethiopian calendar	364–365
Hebrew calendar	4132–4133
- Hindu calendars
Vikram Samvat	428–429
Shaka Samvat	293–294
Kali Yuga	3472–3473
Holocene calendar	10372
Iranian calendar	250 BP – 249 BP
Islamic calendar	258 BH – 257 BH
Javanese calendar	254–255
Julian calendar	372; CCCLXXII
Korean calendar	2705
Minguo calendar	1540 before ROC 民前1540年
Nanakshahi calendar	−1096
Seleucid era	683/684 AG
Thai solar calendar	914–915
Tibetan calendar	ལྕགས་མོ་ལུག་ལོ་ (female Iron-Sheep); 498 or 117 or −655 — to — ཆུ་ཕོ་སྤྲེ་ལོ་ (male Water-Monkey); 499 or 118 or −654

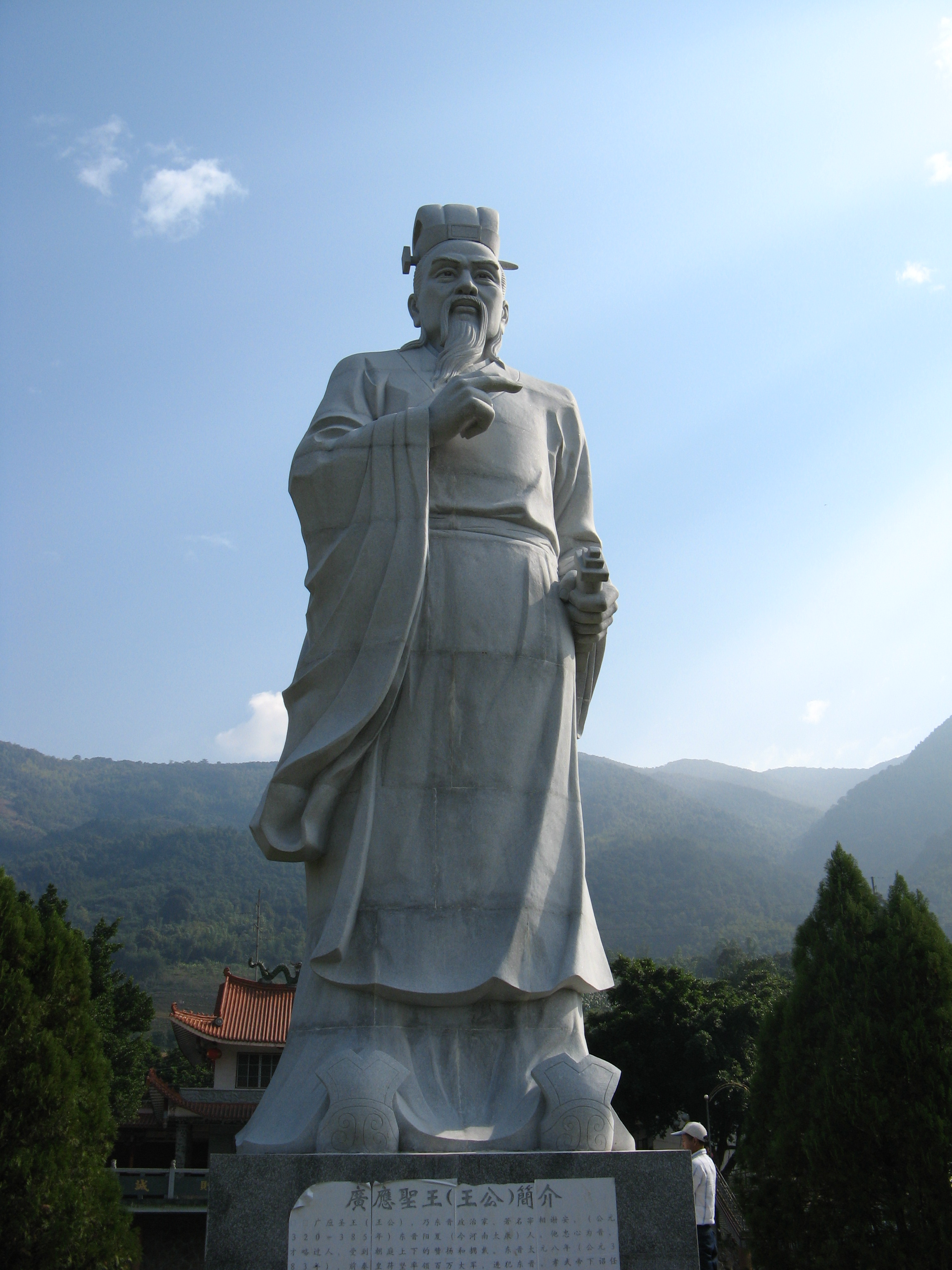
Statue of Xie An (China)

Year 372 (CCCLXXII) was a leap year starting on Sunday of the Julian calendar. At the time, it was known as the Year of the Consulship of Modestus and Arintheus (or, less frequently, year 1125 Ab urbe condita). The denomination 372 for this year has been used since the early medieval period, when the Anno Domini calendar era became the prevalent method in Europe for naming years.

== Events ==
=== By place ===
==== Roman Empire ====
- Emperor Valentinian I is engaged in operations against the Alamanni, Quadi and Sarmatians, while his subordinates are dealing with the Roman usurper Firmus in Africa and the Picts in Britain.

==== Europe ====
- The Huns attack the Tervingi on the Dniester, overwhelming them with light cavalry (horse archers), and devastating the settlements of the Goths. King Athanaric is defeated and seeks refuge in Caucaland in the Carpathian Mountains.
- Athanaric starts building new defensive works to protect his people against the Alans and the Huns.

==== China ====
- Sixteen Kingdoms: Jin Feidi is dethroned as emperor of the Eastern Jin Dynasty. He is replaced by his granduncle Sima Yu, who is installed as Jin Jianwendi.
- September 12 – Jin Xiaowudi, age 10, succeeds his father Jin Jianwendi. Empress Chu Suanzi serves as regent, but decisions are made by the high officials Xie An and Wang Tanzhi.
- The first diplomatic ties are established between the Korean kingdom of Baekje and the Chinese court of the Jin Dynasty.

=== By topic ===
==== Art and Science ====
- The national academy of Chinese learning, called Taehak, is established in the kingdom of Goguryeo (Korea).
- Basil the Great establishes the Basileias, possibly the first hospital, near Caesarea Mazaca on land granted by emperor Valens.

==== Religion ====
- Gregory of Nyssa becomes bishop of Nyssa.
- Buddhism is adopted as the official religion of Gorguryeo.
- Saint Augustine adopts Manichaeism.
- Valentinian I bans Manichaean meetings.

== Births ==
- Pei Songzhi, Chinese historian and politician (d. 451)

== Deaths ==
- Jianwen of Jin, Chinese emperor of the Jin Dynasty (b. 320)
- Maximus of Ephesus, Greek Neoplatonist philosopher
- Sabbas the Goth, Christian reader and saint (b. 334)
