= 337 =

337 in various calendars
Gregorian calendar	337; CCCXXXVII
Ab urbe condita	1090
Assyrian calendar	5087
Balinese saka calendar	258–259
Bengali calendar	−257 – −256
Berber calendar	1287
Buddhist calendar	881
Burmese calendar	−301
Byzantine calendar	5845–5846
Chinese calendar	丙申年 (Fire Monkey); 3034 or 2827 — to — 丁酉年 (Fire Rooster); 3035 or 2828
Coptic calendar	53–54
Discordian calendar	1503
Ethiopian calendar	329–330
Hebrew calendar	4097–4098
- Hindu calendars
Vikram Samvat	393–394
Shaka Samvat	258–259
Kali Yuga	3437–3438
Holocene calendar	10337
Iranian calendar	285 BP – 284 BP
Islamic calendar	294 BH – 293 BH
Javanese calendar	218–219
Julian calendar	337; CCCXXXVII
Korean calendar	2670
Minguo calendar	1575 before ROC 民前1575年
Nanakshahi calendar	−1131
Seleucid era	648/649 AG
Thai solar calendar	879–880
Tibetan calendar	མེ་ཕོ་སྤྲེ་ལོ་ (male Fire-Monkey); 463 or 82 or −690 — to — མེ་མོ་བྱ་ལོ་ (female Fire-Bird); 464 or 83 or −689

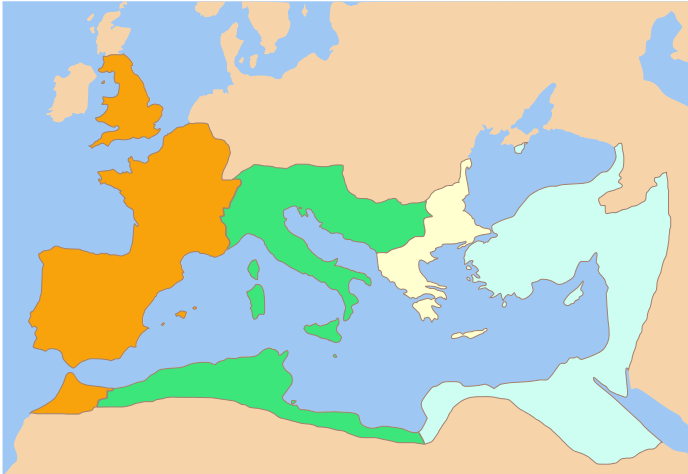
Roman Empire (337) is divided between the territories of (west to east): Constantine II, Constans I, Dalmatius and Constantius II

Year 337 (CCCXXXVII) was a common year starting on Saturday of the Julian calendar. At the time, it was known as the Year of the Consulship of Felicianus and Titianus (or, less frequently, year 1090 Ab urbe condita). The denomination 337 for this year has been used since the early medieval period, when the Anno Domini calendar era became the prevalent method in Europe for naming years.

== Events ==
=== By place ===
==== Roman Empire ====
- May 22 – Constantine the Great, first Christian Roman emperor of the Western Empire (312–324), and of the Roman Empire (324–337), dies in Achyron, near Nicomedia, at age 65, after he is baptized by Eusebius of Nicomedia.
- A number of descendants of Constantius Chlorus, and officials of the Roman Empire, are executed in a purge.
- September 9 – Constantine II, Constantius II, and Constans succeed their father Constantine I as co-emperors. The Roman Empire is divided between the three Augusti.

==== Persia ====
- King Shapur II of Persia begins a war against the Roman Empire. He sends his troops across the Tigris to recover Armenia and Mesopotamia.
- Shapur II besieges the Roman fortress of Nisibis (Syria), but is repulsed by forces under Lucilianus.

==== China ====
- Murong Huang claims the title of Prince of Yan, effectively beginning the kingdom of Former Yan.

=== By topic ===
==== Religion ====
- February 6 – A 4-month papal vacancy ends; Pope Julius I succeeds Pope Mark, as the 35th pope.
- June 17 – Constantius II announces the restoration of Athanasius, as Patriarch of Alexandria.
- Paul I becomes Patriarch of Constantinople.
- Christianity is declared an official religion in Caucasian Iberia, marking the rise of Christianity in Georgia.

== Births ==
- Faxian, Chinese Buddhist monk, traveler (approximate date)
- Fú Jiān, emperor of the Chinese Di state Former Qin (d. 385)
- Lü Guang, founding emperor of the Di state Later Liang (d. 400)
- Zenobius of Florence, Italian bishop and wonderworker (d. 417)

== Deaths ==
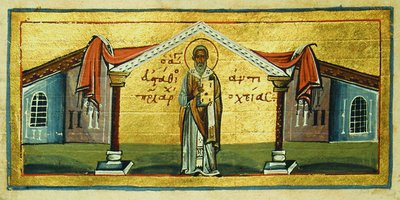
Saint Eustathius of Antioch

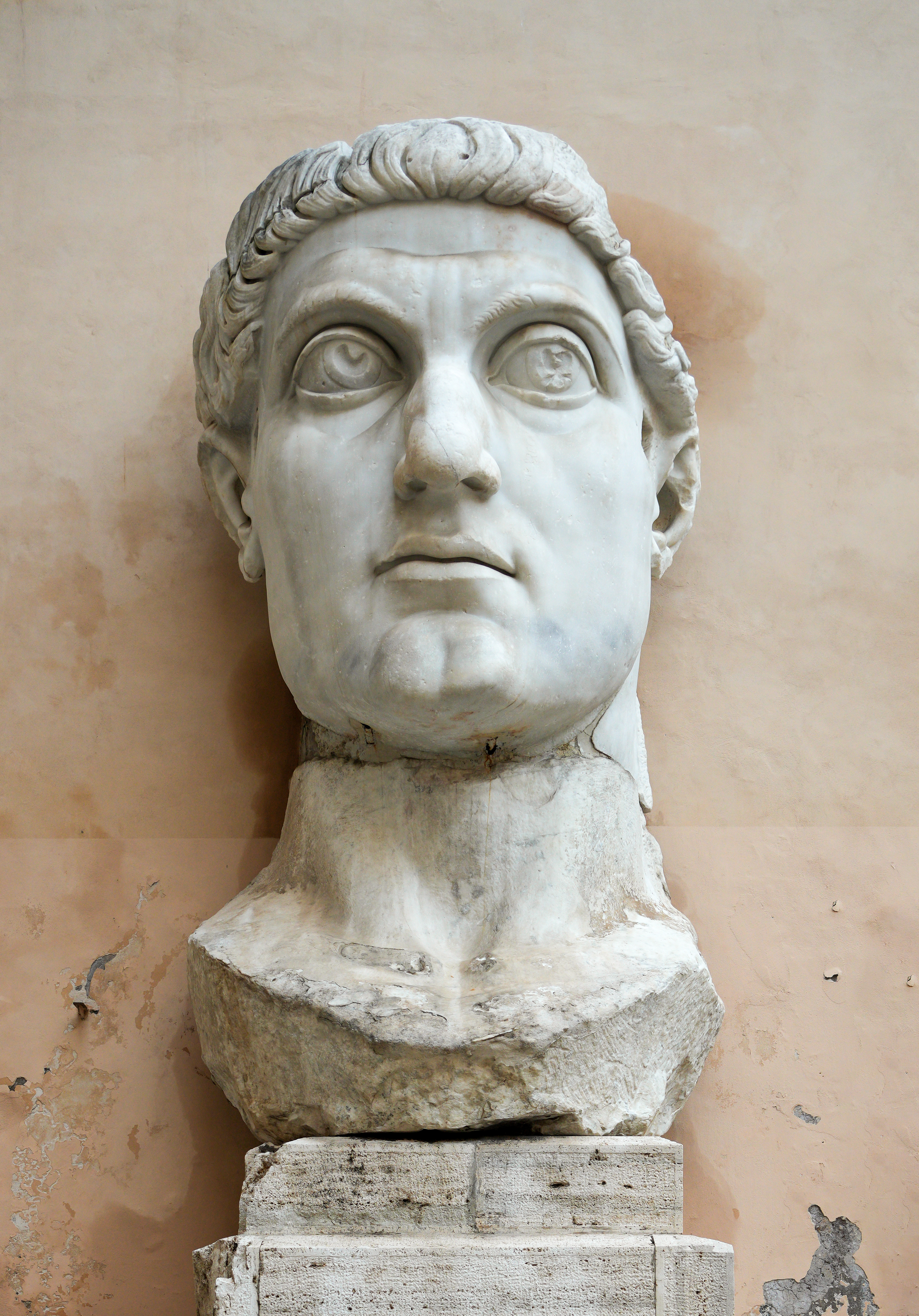
Emperor and Saint Constantine the Great

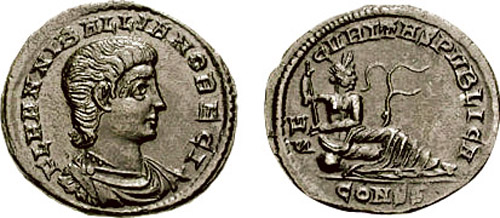
Hannibalianus

- January 13 – Leontius of Caesarea, Roman Catholic bishop and saint
- February 21 – Eustathius the Great, patriarch of Antioch (approximate date)
- May 22 – Constantine the Great, emperor of the Roman Empire, Orthodox priest and saint

Summer 337:

- Flavius Dalmatius, father of Dalmatius and Hannibalianus (executed)
- Julius Constantius, son of Constantius Chlorus (executed)
- Hannibalianus, king of the Pontus and nephew of Constantine I (executed)
- Dalmatius, Caesar and nephew of Constantine I (executed)

August:

- August 30 – Alexander of Constantinople, bishop of Byzantium (approximate date)
