= Dorothea of Alexandria =

Christian virgin and saint

Saint Dorothea of Alexandria
- Died: c. 320; Alexandria, Egypt
- Venerated in: Roman Catholic Church and Coptic Orthodox Church
- Feast: sometimes stated as 6 February, but unofficial

Dorothea of Alexandria (died c. 320) is venerated as a Christian virgin and saint. Her legend states that the Roman Emperor Maximinus Daia courted her, yet she rejected his suit in fidelity to Christianity and virginity, and fled Alexandria. She died in Arabia around 320.

== Historicity ==
Eusebius of Caesarea wrote that Emperor Maximinus had an insane passion for a noble maiden who was famous for her wealth, education, and virginity. When the maiden refused his advances, he exiled her and seized all of her wealth. Eusebius did not name the maiden, yet Tyrannius Rufinus denominated her "Dorothea" and wrote that she fled to Arabia.

Caesar Baronius identified the maiden in Eusebius' narrative as Catherine of Alexandria; however, the hagiographical Bollandists rejected this theory.

In the 16th century, Dorothea was confused with Dorothea of Caesarea, a more famous saint of the same name, whose feast day is 6 February. Consequently, sometimes 6 February was celebrated also as the feast of the Alexandrian saint. She is not recorded in the Roman Martyrology of the Catholic Church.
