= Cyrion and Candidus =

4th century Christian Armenian saints

Saints Cyrion and Candidus (died 320 AD) are Armenian saints. They and the Forty Armenian Martyrs are venerated on March 10.
