= Saint Illuminata =

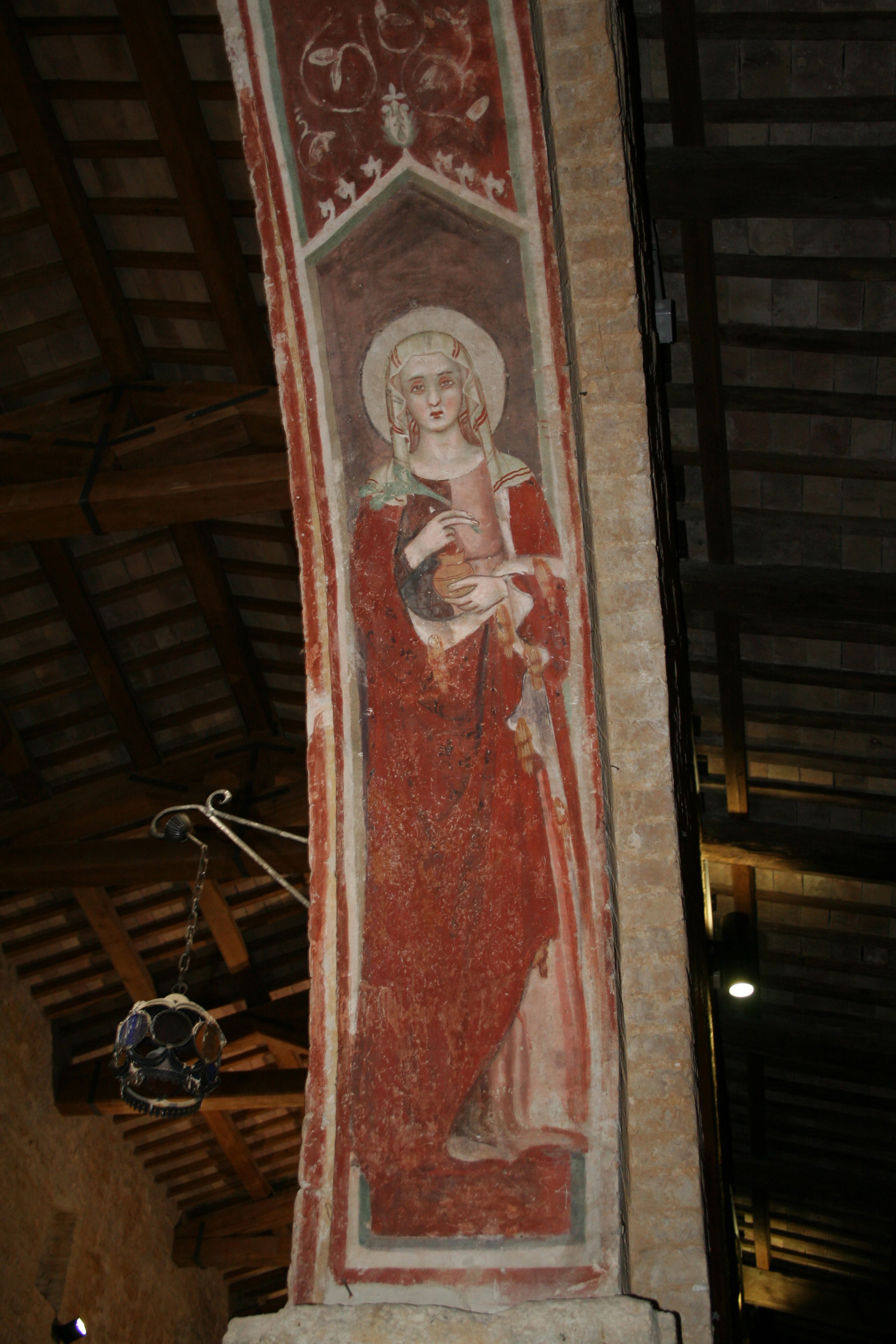
St Illuminata in a fresco in the church of San Salvatore, Canzano

Saint Illuminata was an early Christian woman, martyred c. 320 during the persecutions of Diocletian, and venerated as a Christian saint.

== Biography ==
She was born in Ravenna on the Adriatic coast of Italy, and after being jailed there, she fled to Umbria to live an eremitic life of chastity and prayer, but was executed by the prefect of Massa Martana. Some of her relics were taken to a monastery in Todi. Her feast day is celebrated on 29 November. There is a church in her name in Todi. Antoniazzo Romano painted "St. Vincent, St. Illuminata and St. Nicholas of Tolentino".
