= 376 =

376 in various calendars
- Gregorian calendar: 376; CCCLXXVI
- Ab urbe condita: 1129
- Assyrian calendar: 5126
- Balinese saka calendar: 297–298
- Bengali calendar: −218 – −217
- Berber calendar: 1326
- Buddhist calendar: 920
- Burmese calendar: −262
- Byzantine calendar: 5884–5885
- Chinese calendar: 乙亥年 (Wood Pig); 3073 or 2866 — to — 丙子年 (Fire Rat); 3074 or 2867
- Coptic calendar: 92–93
- Discordian calendar: 1542
- Ethiopian calendar: 368–369
- Hebrew calendar: 4136–4137
- Hindu calendars
- Vikram Samvat: 432–433
- Shaka Samvat: 297–298
- Kali Yuga: 3476–3477
- Holocene calendar: 10376
- Iranian calendar: 246 BP – 245 BP
- Islamic calendar: 254 BH – 253 BH
- Javanese calendar: 258–259
- Julian calendar: 376; CCCLXXVI
- Korean calendar: 2709
- Minguo calendar: 1536 before ROC 民前1536年
- Nanakshahi calendar: −1092
- Seleucid era: 687/688 AG
- Thai solar calendar: 918–919
- Tibetan calendar: ཤིང་མོ་ཕག་ལོ་ (female Wood-Boar); 502 or 121 or −651 — to — མེ་ཕོ་བྱི་བ་ལོ་ (male Fire-Rat); 503 or 122 or −650

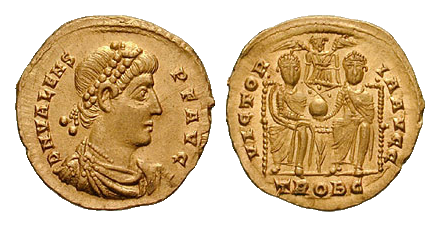
Solidus of Emperor Valens

Year 376 (CCCLXXVI) was a leap year starting on Friday of the Julian calendar. At the time, it was known as the Year of the Consulship of Valens and Augustus (or, less frequently, year 1129 Ab urbe condita). The denomination 376 for this year has been used since the early medieval period, when the Anno Domini calendar era became the prevalent method in Europe for naming years.

== Events ==
=== By place ===
==== Roman Empire ====
- Gothic War: Emperor Valens permits the Visigothic chieftain Fritigern and his people to cross the Danube from Thrace (later Romania), and settle on Roman soil in Lower Moesia, on the condition that they provide soldiers to the legions. The Visigoths embark by troops on boats and rafts, and canoes made from hollowed tree trunks. The river is swollen by frequent rains; a large number try to swim and are drowned in their struggle against the force of the stream.
- The Greuthungi, led by Alatheus and Saphrax, displaced by the predations of the Huns and Alans, request asylum within the Roman Empire. They are refused. The Roman frontier forces stretched to the breaking point, they slip across the Danube and unite with Fritigern. With their situation critical and desperately short of food, discontent is rising amongst the Goths.
- The Romans fail to disarm the Visigoths, bungle administration of the refugees, and mistreat them, taking some of their children as slaves. The Goths break out of their containment area along the Danube and strike south towards the low-lying fertile region near Marcianople (Bulgaria). Although defying the local Roman officials, they are not in open revolt.
- Lupicinus, count (Comes) of Thrace, tries to bring the Visigoths back under control. He invites Fritigern and the Gothic leaders to a banquet, letting them believe that in addition to food and drink, they can discuss provisions for their people. During the feast, Lupicinus tries to assassinate the Gothic delegation. Fritigern escapes and the Goths begin looting and burning the farms and Roman villas near Marcianople.
- Lupicinus attacks the Visigoths 9 miles outside Marcianople with hastily gathered local troops. His force (5,000 men) is annihilated and the Goths equip themselves with Roman armour and weapons. Fritigern marches south towards Adrianople (Turkey).
- Fearing they will join Fritigern, Roman troops of Gothic origin stationed in Adrianople are ordered by Valens to move east. The soldiers request a two-day delay to prepare and ask for food and money for the journey. However, the chief magistrate of Adrianople refuses and the Goths break out in open rebellion. They inflict heavy casualties among the citizens. Arming themselves with Roman equipment, they join forces with Fritigern.
- Winter – Fritigern attempts an unsuccessful siege of Adrianople. His troops try to storm the city walls, but abandon the attacks and break into small bands, better able to forage and feed themselves. Roman prisoners switch sides and give the Goths a valuable source of local intelligence.

==== China ====
- Zhang Tianxi, ruler of Former Liang, submits to Fu Jiān of Former Qin, thus ending the state of Former Liang. Zhang is made "Marquess of Guiyi".
- China is divided between the Former Qin in the north and the Eastern Jin in the south.

== Births ==
- Cyril of Alexandria, Egyptian patriarch (d. 444)

== Deaths ==
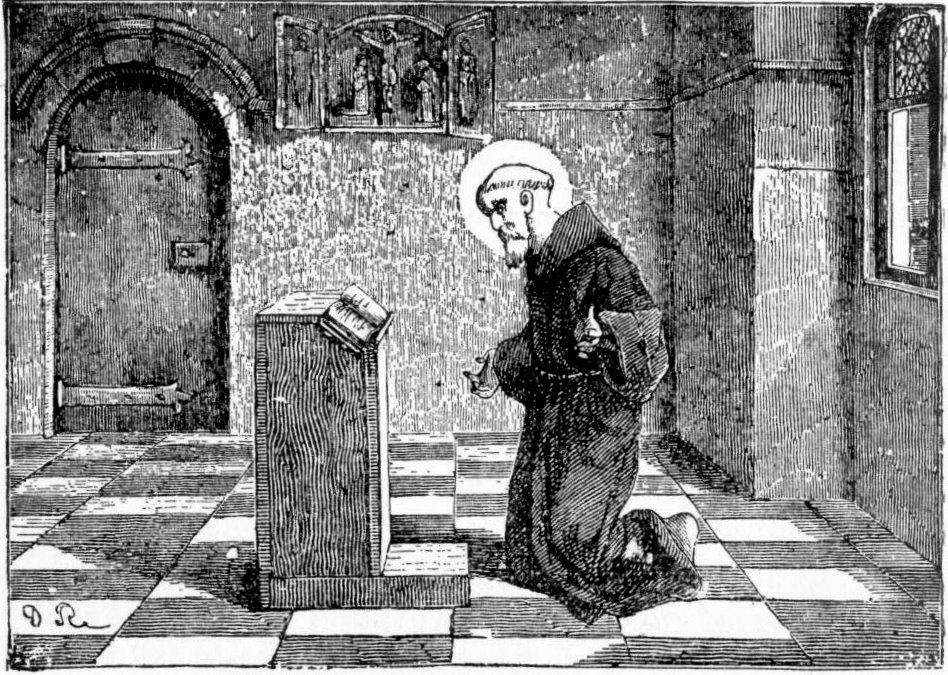
Saint Bademus

- April 10 – Bademus, Christian abbot and saint
- October 10 – Acepsimas of Hnaita, Persian bishop
- Ermanaric, king of the Goths (Greuthungi) (b. 291)
- Theodosius the Elder, Roman general
- Tuoba Shiyiqian, prince of the Tuoba Dai (b. 320)
- Yuan Hong, Chinese historian and politician (b. 328)
