= 378 =

378 in various calendars
Gregorian calendar	378; CCCLXXVIII
Ab urbe condita	1131
Assyrian calendar	5128
Balinese saka calendar	299–300
Bengali calendar	−216 – −215
Berber calendar	1328
Buddhist calendar	922
Burmese calendar	−260
Byzantine calendar	5886–5887
Chinese calendar	丁丑年 (Fire Ox); 3075 or 2868 — to — 戊寅年 (Earth Tiger); 3076 or 2869
Coptic calendar	94–95
Discordian calendar	1544
Ethiopian calendar	370–371
Hebrew calendar	4138–4139
- Hindu calendars
Vikram Samvat	434–435
Shaka Samvat	299–300
Kali Yuga	3478–3479
Holocene calendar	10378
Iranian calendar	244 BP – 243 BP
Islamic calendar	252 BH – 251 BH
Javanese calendar	260–261
Julian calendar	378; CCCLXXVIII
Korean calendar	2711
Minguo calendar	1534 before ROC 民前1534年
Nanakshahi calendar	−1090
Seleucid era	689/690 AG
Thai solar calendar	920–921
Tibetan calendar	མེ་མོ་གླང་ལོ་ (female Fire-Ox); 504 or 123 or −649 — to — ས་ཕོ་སྟག་ལོ་ (male Earth-Tiger); 505 or 124 or −648

Battle of Adrianople (378)

Year 378 (CCCLXXVIII) was a common year starting on Monday of the Julian calendar. At the time, it was known as the Year of the Consulship of Valens and Augustus (or, less frequently, year 1131 Ab urbe condita). The denomination 378 for this year has been used since the early medieval period, when the Anno Domini calendar era became the prevalent method in Europe for naming years.

== Events ==
=== By place ===
==== Roman Empire ====
- Spring – Emperor Valens returns to Constantinople and mobilises an army (40,000 men). He appoints Sebastianus, newly arrived from Italy, as magister militum to reorganize the Roman armies in Thrace.
- February – The Lentienses (part of the Alemanni) cross the frozen Rhine and raid the countryside. They are driven back by Roman auxilia palatina (Celtae and Petulantes), who defend the western frontier.
- May – Battle of Argentovaria: Emperor Gratian is forced to recall the army he has sent East. The Lentienses are defeated by Mallobaudes near Colmar (France). Gratian gains the title Alemannicus Maximus.
- Gothic War: Valens sends Sebastian with a body of picked troops (2,000 men) to Thrace and renews the guerrilla war against the Goths. He chases down small groups of Gothic raiders around Adrianople.
- Fritigern concentrates his army at Cabyle (Bulgaria). The Goths are mainly centred in the river valleys south of the Balkan Mountains, around the towns of Beroea, Cabyle and Dibaltum.
- July – Frigeridus, Roman general, fortifies the Succi (Ihtiman) Pass to prevent the "barbarians" from breaking out to the north-west (Pannonia).
- Gratian sets out from Lauriacum (Austria) with a body of light armed troops. His force is small enough to travel by boat down the Danube. He halts for four days at Sirmium (Serbia) suffering from fever.
- August – Gratian continues down the Danube to the "Camp of Mars" (frontier fortress near modern Niš), where he loses several men in an ambush by a band of Alans.
- Fritigern strikes south from Cabyle, following the Tundzha River towards Adrianople, and tries to get behind the supply lines to Constantinople.
- Roman reconnaissance detects the Goths. Valens, already west of Adrianople, turns back and establishes a fortified camp outside the city.
- The Goths, with their wagons and families vulnerable to attack, withdraw back to the north. Roman scouts fail to detect the Greuthungi cavalry foraging further up the Tundzha valley.
- Fritigern sends a Christian priest to the Roman camp with an offer of terms and a letter for Valens. The peace overtures are rejected.
- August 9 – Battle of Adrianople: Valens leads an elite Roman army to Thrace to confront revolts, but is defeated.
- The Goths attack Adrianople; they attempt to scale the city walls with ladders but are repelled by the defenders, who drop lumps of masonry.
- The Goths, supported by the Huns, move on to Constantinople. Their progress is checked by the Saracens, recruited from Arab tribes who control the eastern fringes of the empire.
- October – The Greuthungi, faced with food shortages, split off and move west into Pannonia. Followed by their families, they raid villages and farmland.

==== Mesoamerica ====
- Siyaj K'ak' begins to replace Mayan kings with relatives of Spearthrower Owl, emperor of Teotihuacan.
- Siyaj K'ak' conquers Waka on January 8.
- Siyaj K'ak' conquers Tikal on January 16.
- Siyaj K'ak' conquers Uaxactun.

=== By topic ===
==== Architecture ====
- Valens completes the aqueduct of Constantinople begun by Constantine I.

==== Religion ====
- Gregory of Nazianzus is ordained bishop of Constantinople.
- Pope Damasus I is accused of adultery but is exonerated by Gratian.

== Births ==
- Germanus of Auxerre, Christian bishop (approximate date)

== Deaths ==
- August 9
  - Sebastianus, Roman general (magister peditum)
  - Traianus, Roman general (magister militum)
  - Valens, Roman consul and emperor (b. 328)
- Flavius Arintheus, Roman politician and general
- Titus of Bostra, Christian bishop and theologian
