= 350 =

350 in various calendars
- Gregorian calendar: 350; CCCL
- Ab urbe condita: 1103
- Assyrian calendar: 5100
- Balinese saka calendar: 271–272
- Bengali calendar: −244 – −243
- Berber calendar: 1300
- Buddhist calendar: 894
- Burmese calendar: −288
- Byzantine calendar: 5858–5859
- Chinese calendar: 己酉年 (Earth Rooster); 3047 or 2840 — to — 庚戌年 (Metal Dog); 3048 or 2841
- Coptic calendar: 66–67
- Discordian calendar: 1516
- Ethiopian calendar: 342–343
- Hebrew calendar: 4110–4111
- Hindu calendars
- Vikram Samvat: 406–407
- Shaka Samvat: 271–272
- Kali Yuga: 3450–3451
- Holocene calendar: 10350
- Iranian calendar: 272 BP – 271 BP
- Islamic calendar: 280 BH – 279 BH
- Javanese calendar: 232–233
- Julian calendar: 350; CCCL
- Korean calendar: 2683
- Minguo calendar: 1562 before ROC 民前1562年
- Nanakshahi calendar: −1118
- Seleucid era: 661/662 AG
- Thai solar calendar: 892–893
- Tibetan calendar: ས་མོ་བྱ་ལོ་ (female Earth-Bird); 476 or 95 or −677 — to — ལྕགས་ཕོ་ཁྱི་ལོ་ (male Iron-Dog); 477 or 96 or −676

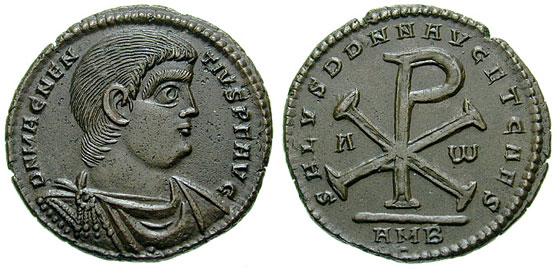
Magnus Magnentius

Year 350 (CCCL) was a common year starting on Monday of the Julian calendar. At the time, it was known as the Year of the Consulship of Sergius and Nigrinianus (or, less frequently, year 1103 Ab urbe condita). The denomination 350 for this year has been used since the early medieval period, when the Anno Domini calendar era became the prevalent method in Europe for naming years.

== Events ==
=== By place ===
==== Roman Empire ====
- January 18 – Western Roman Emperor Constans I makes himself extremely unpopular; one of his generals, Magnentius, is proclaimed emperor at Augustodunum in the Diocese of Galliae, with the support of the army on the Rhine frontier.
- January – Constans I flees towards Spain, where he is subsequently assassinated at Castrum Helenae. Magnentius rules the Western portion of the Roman Empire and is far more tolerant towards Christians and Pagans alike.
- March 1 – Vetranio is asked by Constantina, sister of Constantius II, to proclaim himself Caesar. Constantius accepts the new emperor and sends him funds to raise an army.
- June 3 – Nepotianus, Roman usurper, proclaims himself emperor and enters Rome with a group of gladiators.
- June 30 – Nepotianus is defeated and killed by Marcellinus, a trusted general sent by Magnentius. His head is put on a spear and carried around the city.
- December 25 – Vetranio meets Constantius II at Naissus (Serbia) and joins forces with him. Vetranio is forced to abdicate his title, and Constantius allows him to live as a private citizen on a state pension.

==== Asia ====
- King Pushyavarman establishes the Varman Dynasty in Assam.
- About this time the Huns begin to invade the Sassanid Empire.
- The city of Anbar (Iraq) is founded by king Shapur II.
- The Ran Wei-Later Zhao war breaks out in North China. Ethnic Han ruler Ran Min had used the infighting between the brothers who reigned in quick succession as emperors of the Jie state of the Later Zhao to assume power, establish the Ran Wei dynasty, have an alleged 200,000 non-Han subjects (mostly Jie and Xiongnu) massacred and end the Later Zhao dynasty. This situation will soon be exploited by the neighbouring state of Former Yan which expands from the northeast towards the Yellow River.

Africa

- At around this time, Ezana of Aksum conquers the Kingdom of Kush, declaring himself "King of Ethiopia" in the Ezana Stone

=== By topic ===
==== Art ====
- The church of Santa Constanza in Rome is finished.

== Births ==
- Honoratus, archbishop of Arles (approximate date);
- Hypatia of Alexandria, female Neoplatonist philosopher (approximate date);
- Murong Wei, emperor of the Xianbei state Former Yan (d. 385);
- Plutarch of Athens, Greek philosopher (approximate date);
- Theodore of Mopsuestia, bishop and theologian (approximate date);
- Zhang Xuanjing, ruler of the Chinese state Former Liang (d. 363).
- Earliest common ancestor of Y haplotype R-S6881 born in north-west Germania (approximate date)

== Deaths ==
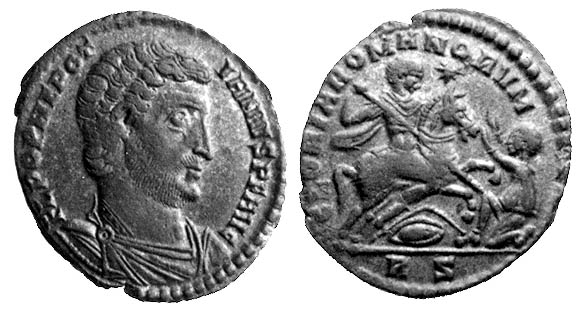
Nepotianus died on June 30, 350

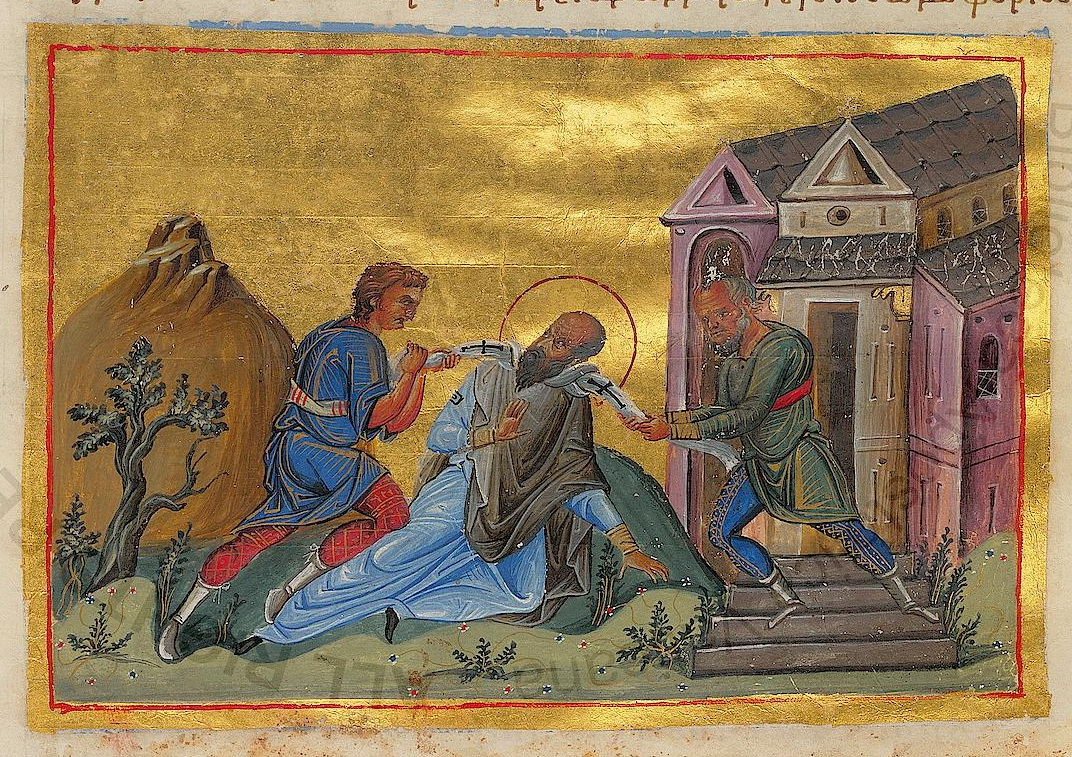
Saint Paul I of Constantinople

- February 11 – Constans I, Roman Emperor;
- June 21 – Martin of Tongeren, Roman Catholic bishop and saint;
- June 30 – Nepotianus, Roman usurper;
- August 5 – Cassian of Autun Roman Catholic bishop and saint;
- November 26 – Paul I of Constantinople, Byzantine Orthodox bishop and saint.

=== Date unknown ===
- Shi Jian, emperor of the Jie state Later Zhao.
