= 290s =

Decade

The 290s decade ran from January 1, 290, to December 31, 299.

== Events ==
=== 290 ===
==== By place ====
====== Roman Empire ======
- Emperor Diocletian campaigns with success against Arabic enemies.
- Following his victory over Emperor Maximian's fleet, the usurper Carausius invades the European mainland and re-establishes his military and administrative presence in northern Gaul.

====== Asia ======
- May 16 – Emperor Wu of Jin, founder of the Western Jin Dynasty, dies after a 25-year reign. He reunified north and south, but gave away many dukedoms to his kinsmen. Crown Prince Sima Zhong succeeds his father, and has to deal with conflicts among the aristocratic families in China.

=== 291 ===
==== By place ====
====== Roman Empire ======
- Winter: The emperors Diocletian and Maximian convene in Milan.
- An uneasy peace is established between the emperors Diocletian and Maximian on the one hand, and the rival emperor Carausius on the other.
- Perhaps in cooperation with the forces of Maximian, Carausius campaigns successfully against Germanic raids in Gaul and Britain. Also during his reign, Carausius begins building the forts of the Saxon Shore.

====== Northern Europe ======
- The Alemanni, having been expelled from part of their territory by the Burgundians, seek to regain their lost lands. These peoples had unsuccessfully invaded Gaul in tandem in 285/6, and the Alemanni had likely been weakened by the Roman counter-invasions of 287 and 288.
- A force of Goths defeat the Burgundians.
- The Tervingian Goths and Taifali fight the Vandals and Gepids.

====== Africa ======
- The Blemmyes invade the Kingdom of Kush.

====== Persian Empire ======
- King Bahram II fights against a coalition consisting of his brother Hormizd of Sakastan, the Kushano-Sasanians, and the Gilans.

====== China ======
- War of the Eight Princes: After the death of Emperor Sima Yan (Jin Wudi), a civil war breaks out among the princes and dukes of the Jin Dynasty. The struggle devastates and depopulates the provinces of northern China.

=== 292 ===
==== By place ====
====== Roman Empire ======
- The jurist Gregorius, at the court of Emperor Diocletian, produces the Gregorian Code, the first codification of Roman law (approximate date).

====== Asia ======
- Bongsang becomes ruler of the Korean kingdom of Goguryeo.

====== Mesoamerica ======
- The oldest known Mayan stele is erected at the capital Tikal (modern Guatemala).

=== 293 ===
==== By place ====
====== Roman Empire ======
- March 1 – Emperors Diocletian and Maximian appoint Constantius I and Galerius as Caesars. This is considered the beginning of the Tetrarchy, known as the Quattuor Principes Mundi ("Four Rulers of the World"). (Some sources and scholars date Galerius' elevation to May 21.)
- Constantius retakes some of the Gallic territories from the usurper Carausius. He conquers the crucial port of Bononia (modern Boulogne).
- Towards the end of the year, Carausius is murdered by his finance minister Allectus, who proclaims himself the new emperor of Britain.
- In this or the following year, Constantius defeats the Franks in Batavia (Netherlands).
- Galerius begins a series of two campaigns in Upper Egypt against the rebel cities of Coptos and Boresis as well as the Blemmyes and Meroitic Nubians.
- Over the course of his reign, but especially from the time of the Tetrarchy's creation, Diocletian divides the large provinces of the early empire into smaller administrative units, and he groups these new smaller provinces into dioceses. He also accelerates the third-century trend whereby the administration and military of the provinces are increasingly divided between governors and generals (duces) respectively, whereas formerly governors had also been in charge of the legions. This expansion of imperial personnel increases Diocletian's control over the empire and weakens the power of individual officials and officers. Moreover, Diocletian expands the retinues of the individual emperors to have more ministers and secretaries, thus establishing what will become known as the late Roman Consistorium.

====== Persia ======
- King Bahram II of the Persian Empire dies after a 17-year reign; his son Bahram III ascends to the throne. After four months, Bahram III's great-uncle Narseh, the king of Persarmenia, marches on the Persian capital Ctesiphon with the support of a faction of the nobility and the eastern Satraps. Bahram is overthrown and Narseh is declared the new King of Kings.

====== China ======
- Tuoba Fu succeeds his uncle Tuoba Chuo, as chieftain of the Chinese Tuoba Clan.

==== By topic ====
====== Religion ======
- Probus succeeds Rufinus, as Bishop of Byzantium.

=== 294 ===
==== By place ====
====== Asia ======
- Persian shahanshah Narseh defeats King Tiridates III of Armenia, and forces him to flee to the Roman Empire.
- Tuoba Luguan succeeds his nephew Tuoba Fu, as chieftain of the Chinese Tuoba clan.

=== 295 ===
==== By place ====
====== Roman Empire ======
- Emperor Diocletian defeats the Carpi.
- Caesar Galerius completes a series of two campaigns in Upper Egypt, against the rebel cities of Coptos and Boresis, as well as the Blemmyes and Meroitic Nubians.
- The jurist Hermogenianus, at the court of Diocletian, produces the Hermogenian Code. This new codification of Roman law complements the Gregorian Code of c. 292.
- Diocletian, perhaps through Galerius, issues an edict against incest.

====== China ======
- Tuoba Luguan divides the territory of the Tuoba clan into three areas. His nephews Tuoba Yilu and Tuoba Yituo become chieftains of the western and central areas of (Shanxi province). Tuoba Luguan dominates the eastern area (near Hohhot).

==== By topic ====
====== Religion ======
- Petra rejoins the province of Palestine, and is converted to Christianity by the Syrian monk Barsauma.

=== 296 ===
==== By place ====
====== Roman Empire ======
- In this or the previous year, Caesar Constantius I assembles two invasion fleets with the intent of overthrowing the usurper Allectus, who is based in Britain. The first is under the command of Asclepiodotus, Maximian's long-serving Praetorian Prefect. Asclepiodotus sails from the mouth of the Seine, and lands near the Isle of Wight, where his forces defeat Allectus in Hampshire. Allectus is killed in the fighting. Constantius leaves Boulogne with his fleet, and occupies London, where he slaughters some of Allectus' Frankish mercenaries. With this victory, the Romano-British regime first established by Carausius is overthrown, and Britain is re-incorporated into the rest of the empire.
- Having supervised the Rhine frontier during Constantius' invasion of Britain, Maximian then marches into Spain, where he fights Frankish pirates. He then crosses into North Africa to contend with the rebellion of the Quinquegentiani.
- The Persian king Narseh invades Roman-held Upper Mesopotamia and Arsacid western Armenia, the latter territory being under the leadership of the pro-Roman king Tiridates III. With only a small army, Caesar Galerius fights three holding actions against Narseh's army in Mesopotamia. Somewhere in the open plains between Carrhae and Callinicum, Galerius' army suffers a defeat against the Persian army, which is both more numerous and contains superior numbers of high-quality cavalry. Nevertheless, Galerius succeeds in blunting the Persian offensive.

==== By topic ====
====== Religion ======
- April 22 – Pope Caius dies after a 13-year reign and is succeeded by Marcellinus as the 29th pope of Rome.

=== 297 ===
==== By place ====
====== Roman Empire ======
- Emperor Diocletian introduces a new tax system and other economic reforms.
- Diocletian watches over the Syrian provinces while Caesar Galerius makes preparations for a campaign against the Persian king Narseh. He recruits veterans from Illyria and Moesia, recruits new soldiers, and strengthens his army with Gothic mercenaries and the Armenian units of Tiridates III.
- August: Domitius Domitianus launches a usurpation against Diocletian in Egypt. He is perhaps aided by popular discontent with Diocletian's taxation reform.
- Autumn: Diocletian besieges the rebels in Alexandria.
- December: Domitianus dies, but his corrector Aurelius Achilleus takes over as the leader of the rebellion.
- Battle of Satala: Galerius launches a surprise attack against Narseh's camp in western Armenia. The Romans sack the camp and capture Narseh's wives, sisters and daughters, including his Queen of Queens Arsane. Narseh is wounded and escapes to his empire.

=== 298 ===
==== By place ====
====== Roman Empire ======
- Spring: Emperor Diocletian retakes Alexandria and crushes the usurpation of Aurelius Achilleus.
- Diocletian then travels into Upper Egypt and possibly campaigns on the Nubian frontier. In either this year or in 300/301, he makes agreements with the Meroitic Nubians and the Blemmyes. He agrees to pay subsidies to both peoples, and he cedes the Dodecashoenos to the Nubians on the understanding that the Nubians will defend the region against the Blemmyes.
- Caesar Galerius restores Tiridates III to the throne of Armenia and invades the Sassanid Empire. His army marches through Adiabene, Atropatene, Susiana and Lower Mesopotamia. He then retakes the strategically important city of Nisibis in Upper Mesopotamia.

====== Korea ======
- The manufacture of cultured silk becomes popular from Korea to Japan.
- Bunseo becomes king of the Korean kingdom of Baekje.
- Girim becomes the king of the Korean kingdom of Silla.

=== 299 ===
==== By place ====
====== Roman Empire ======
- Peace of Nisibis: Emperor Diocletian signs a treaty with the Persian king Narseh that will last for 40 years. The Persians accept Roman dominion over Armenia, the Caucasus, and Upper Mesopotamia. The pro-Roman ruler Tiridates III receives all of Armenia as far as the border with Atropatene. Mirian III of the Kingdom of Iberia is made a Roman client, and at some point in time, as a result of the treaty, Caucasian Albania will follow suit. Rome also gains five satrapies beyond the Tigris, which are perhaps given to Tiridates to administer.
- To celebrate his victory over the Persians, Galerius commissions the Arch of Galerius in Thessaloniki (modern Greece).
- In this or the following year, Galerius campaigns with success against Sarmatians and the Marcomanni, attacking through a swamp to defeat a Sarmatian army.
- Having first crossed into Africa in 296, Emperor Maximian concludes his campaigns against the Quinquegentiani and other Berbers. His campaigns had ranged as far as Mauretania in the west and Tripolitania in the east. Julianus, a rebel leader in Africa, throws himself into a fire after the Romans breach the walls of his stronghold.
- Returning to Rome in triumph, Maximian commissions the Baths of Diocletian in honour of his 'brother' Diocletian.
- Diocletian expels Christians from the Roman army.

====== China ======
- Empress Jia Nanfeng frames Crown Prince Yu for treason and has him deposed.

== Births ==
290

- Abramios the Recluse, Christian hermit and ascetic (d. 360)
- Pappus of Alexandria, Greek mathematician (d. 350)
- Vitus (or Guido), Roman hagiographer and martyr

291

- Saint Agnes, Christian martyress (d. c. 304)
- Saint Hilarion, anchorite and saint (d. 371)
- Li Xiu, female general during the Jin Dynasty
- Saint Philomena, Christian martyress (d. c. 304)

292

- He Chong (or Cidao), Chinese politician (d. 346)
- Pachomius, Christian theologian and writer (d. 348)
- Zhu Jingjian, Chinese Buddhist nun (d. 361)

294

- Sima Bao, Chinese prince of the Jin Dynasty (d. 320)

295

- Shi Hu, Chinese emperor of Later Zhao (d. 349)

296

- Yu Bing (or Jijian), Chinese politician (d. 344)

297

- Murong Huang, ruler of the Former Yan (d. 348)
- Yu Wenjun, empress of the Jin Dynasty (d. 328)

298

- Athanasius of Alexandria, Egyptian patriarch (d. 373)

299

- Jin Mingdi, Chinese emperor of the Jin Dynasty (d. 325)

== Deaths ==
290

- May 16 – Wu of Jin, Chinese emperor of the Jin Dynasty (b. 236)
- Tao Huang (or Shiying), Chinese general and politician

291

- Sima Liang, regent during the reign of Sima Yan
- Sima Wei, prince during the Jin Dynasty (b. 271)
- Wei Guan, general of the Kingdom of Wei (b. 220)
- Wen Yang, general of the Kingdom of Wei (b. 238)
- Yang Jun, official during the reign of Sima Yan

292

- Yang Zhi, Chinese empress of the Jin Dynasty (b. 259)

293

- Bahram II, king of the Sassanid Empire
- Bahram III, king of the Sassanid Empire
- Carausius, Roman general and usurper
- Tuoba Chuo, Chinese chieftain of the Tuoba tribe
- Yuwen Mohuai, Chinese chieftain of the Yuwen tribe

294

- Tuoba Fu, chieftain of the Chinese Tuoba clan

295

- Maximilian of Tebessa, Berber Christian saint and martyr

296

- April 22 – Caius, bishop of Rome
- Allectus, Roman treasurer and usurper-emperor
- Guo Huai (or Yuhuang), Chinese noblewoman (b. 237)

297

- Chen Shou, author of the San Guo Zhi (b. 233)
- Zhou Chu, Jin dynasty general, son of Zhou Fang (b. 236)

298

- Aurelius Achilleus, Roman usurper
- Cassian of Tangier, Christian martyr
- Chaekgye of Baekje, Korean ruler
- Marcellus of Tangier, Christian martyr
- Yurye of Silla (or Yuri), Korean ruler

299

- Judah bar Ezekiel, Babylonian amora (b. 220)
- Qi Wannian, Chinese chieftain and rebel leader
