= 270s =

Decade

The 270s decade ran from January 1, 270, to December 31, 279.

== Events ==
=== 270 ===
==== By place ====
====== Roman Empire ======
- Emperor Claudius II Gothicus fights a drawn-out campaign against the Gothic raiders in the Balkans, with setbacks suffered on both sides. Eventually, many Goths die of plague and others are absorbed into the Roman legions.
- Zenobia seizes control of Roman Arabia and Egypt.
- Claudius dies of plague in Sirmium while preparing to fight the Vandals and Sarmatians, who have invaded Pannonia. He is succeeded by his brother Quintillus, who briefly holds power over the Roman Empire.
- Victorinus besieges and sacks the city of Autun, which had declared allegiance to Claudius.
- Lucius Domitius Aurelianus (or Aurelian), the cavalry commander who distinguished himself in the previous year at the Battle of Naissus (Serbia), usurps power in Sirmium and marches against Quintillus in Aquileia. Quintillus commits suicide.
- Aurelius defeats an incursion by the Iuthungi into Raetia, defeating them as they attempted to re-cross the Danube.

====== Asia ======
- Fan Hsiung, aka Pham Hung, comes to power in Champa and raids the Chinese-occupied territory of Tonkin.
- Seocheon becomes ruler of the Korean kingdom of Goguryeo.

====== Africa ======
- The Kingdom of Aksum (modern Ethiopia) begins minting its own gold coins to facilitate international trade, following the model of Roman coinage.
- Anthony the Great, a Christian saint from Egypt, regarded as "Father of All Monks", enters the wilderness to become ascetic.

=== 271 ===
==== By place ====
====== Roman Empire ======
- After an indecisive battle, Emperor Aurelian defeats the Vandals, and forces them from Pannonia, and across the Danube.
- Battle of Placentia: The Iuthungi invade Italy and sack the city of Piacenza. A Roman army under Emperor Aurelian is ambushed and defeated.
  - Battle of Fano: The Iuthungi move towards a defenseless Rome. Aurelian rallies his men and defeats the Germanic tribes on the Metauro River, just inland of Fano.
  - Battle of Pavia: The Roman army pursues the Alamanni in Lombardy. Aurelian closes the passes in the Alps and encircles the invaders near Pavia. The Alamanni are destroyed and Aurelian receives the title Germanicus Maximus.
- Following Aurelian's execution of Felicissimus, the financial minister of the state treasury, on the charge of corruption, the mint workers of the city of Rome, with senatorial support, lead an uprising against Aurelian. In bitter street-fighting on the Caelian Hill the rebels are defeated. The revolt is followed by a purge of Aurelian's senatorial opponents, including Urbanus.
- Around this time, generals loyal to Aurelian defeat the usurpers Septimius in Dalmatia and Domitian II in southern Gaul. The Iuthungian invasion may have encouraged the spate of revolts.
- Aurelian begins construction of a new defensive wall to protect Rome. The Aurelian Walls, 19 kilometers (12 mi), enclose the city with fortifications.
- Perhaps around this time, Aurelian increases Rome's daily bread ration to nearly 1.5 pounds and adds pig fat to the list of foods distributed free to the populace.
- Aurelian defeats a Gothic raid into the Balkans and then invades the Gothic homeland. Here he defeats the Goths again, killing one of their leaders, Cannabas, who may be Cniva, the Goth who had won the battle of Abritus, at which Emperor Decius was killed.
- Aurelian withdraws Rome's administrative and military presence from Dacia (modern Romania), thereby rationalizing the Danube frontier and freeing resources for the forthcoming campaign against Zenobia.

====== Europe ======
- Victorinus, Emperor of the Gallic Empire, is assassinated by one of his officers, Attitianus, reportedly for reasons of personal revenge. He is succeeded by Tetricus I, who is elevated with the help of Victorinus' mother Victoria.

====== Near East ======
- Zenobia invades Asia Minor and seizes control of Cilicia and Galatia before being stalled in Bithynia.
- Shapur I of the Sasanian Empire dies, and his successor, his son Hormizd I, leads an army against nomads in Sogdiana, perhaps taking command of a war that had begun under his father. (Note: Some scholars date Shapur's death to 270 or 272)

==== By topic ====
====== Art and Science ======
- King Shapur I builds the Academy of Gundishapur (Iran), which becomes the intellectual center of the Sassanid Empire.
- A magnetic compass is first used in China.

=== 272 ===
==== By place ====
====== Roman Empire ======
- Emperor Aurelian launches a two-pronged invasion of the Palmyrene Empire, sending his commander Marcus Aurelius Probus to restore Roman rule in Egypt while he marches into Asia Minor.
- As part of a strategy of clemency, Aurelian spares Tyana after capturing the city. This strategy encourages units under Zenobia to defect to Aurelian.
- Battle of Immae: Aurelian defeats the Palmyrene heavy cavalry (clibanarii) near Antioch. Queen Zenobia flees under cover of darkness to Emesa (Syria).
- Aurelian supports the bishops of Italy in deposing the bishop of Antioch, Paul of Samosata, who had been a supporter of Zenobia. This is the first recorded instance of an imperial intervention in an ecclesiastical dispute.
- Battle of Emesa: Aurelian decisively defeats the Palmyrene army.
- Aurelian besieges Palmyra. Zenobia attempts to escape to Persia but is captured on the Euphrates. Palmyra surrenders soon after.
- Following a series of trials held in Emesa, Cassius Longinus and other advisors of Zenobia are executed for conspiring against Aurelian.

==== By topic ====
====== Religion ======
- Dometius succeeds Titus as Patriarch of Constantinople.
- Saint Denis, first Bishop of Paris, and two of his disciples are beheaded on the road to the Temple of Mercury that stands atop a hill outside of the city. The hill will later be called Montmartre (Mountain of Martyrs) in Lutetia (modern Paris).
- Paul of Samosata is deposed as Patriarch of Antioch.

=== 273 ===
==== By place ====
====== Roman Empire ======
- Marcus Claudius Tacitus, future Roman Emperor, is consul in Rome.
- Emperor Aurelian defeats an incursion by the Carpi into Moesia and Thrace.
- Aurelian sacks the city of Palmyra, after putting down a second revolt.
- In bitter street-fighting, Aurelian crushes a rebellion in Alexandria by Firmus, a sympathizer of Palmyra. Firmus is strangled to death.

====== Persia ======
- King Hormizd I of Persia dies after a brief reign in which he has shown tolerance toward the ascetic, anti-materialist Manichean faith. He is succeeded by his brother Bahram I, who has been governing the province of Atropatene. Bahram proceeds to crush a rebellion by various vassal kings.

=== 274 ===
==== By place ====
====== Roman Empire ======
- Battle of Châlons: The Emperor Aurelian invades Gaul to campaign against the Gallic Empire (Gaul and Britain). In the Catalaunian Plains, the Romano-Gallic Emperor Tetricus I surrenders to Aurelian and leaves his army without an emperor. The Gallic army is then crushed by Aurelian in a major battle. With the conquests of the Palmyrene Empire and the Gallic Empire, the Roman Empire is united again. However, the heavy losses incurred by the Gallic forces compromises the Rhine frontier.
- Rome greets Aurelian as Restitutor Orbis ("Restorer of the World") and accords him a magnificent triumph (victory procession), which is graced by his captives Zenobia, Tetricus I, and his son Tetricus II.
- Aurelian reforms the Roman currency, replacing the denarius with a new version of the antoninianus that has a slightly improved silver-to-copper ratio. This overhaul of the currency system causes hyper-inflation.
- Germanic tribes take advantage of the destroyed Roman forces of the Rhine to raid Gaul.
- December 25 – Aurelian has the Temple of the Sun dedicated to Sol Invictus, on the third day after the solstice and day of rebirth of the sun. This religion, which is in essence monotheistic, becomes the state religion of Rome.

====== Africa ======
- The Kingdom of Aksum attains great prosperity thanks to its control of Red Sea trade.

==== By topic ====
====== Religion ======
- March 2 – Mani, a sage of Persia, dies at Gundeshapur after 30 years of preaching his "heresy" at the court of the late Sassanian King Shapur I and on long journeys to Khorasan, India and China. He is executed or allowed to die in prison, and claims to be a prophet of God. Mani combines Zoroastrian dualism with Christian theology, and his disciples gain wide support for Manichaeism, despite opposition from Roman Emperors.
- December 30 – Pope Felix I dies in Rome after a 5-year reign.

====== Transportation ======
- Japanese shipwrights build a 100-foot oar-powered vessel for Emperor Ōjin. The Japanese will not use sails for another seven centuries.

=== 275 ===
==== By place ====
====== Roman Empire ======
- Emperor Aurelian puts down unrest in Gaul, and defeats Germanic incursions into Gaul and Raetia (these problems have been caused by Aurelian's defeat and overthrow of the Gallic Empire).
- The Goths begin to raid Thrace and Asia Minor. Aurelian begins a campaign against the Goths in Thrace.
- c. November – Aurelian is assassinated near Byzantium (Turkey). Aurelian has developed a reputation for punishing corruption with severity, and his secretary Eros is under suspicion. As a result, Eros, fearing for his life, has forged a list of high-ranking officers marked for execution. In this way, the secretary tricks the officers into assassinating Aurelian, and they then flee into Asia Minor to avoid the wrath of the soldiers.
- November/December – Marcus Claudius Tacitus is proclaimed Emperor by the imperial field army (other sources give him as proclaimed September 25 by the Senate). His half brother Marcus Annius Florianus becomes praetorian prefect.
- Tacitus marches into Asia Minor to fight the Goths and track down the faction responsible for assassinating Aurelian.

====== Asia ======
- The Pallava dynasty begins in Southern India.
- Approximate date – Himyar king Shammar Yahri'sh conquers Hadhramaut, Najran and Tihamah, unifying the territory later known as Yemen.

==== By topic ====
====== Religion ======
- January 4 – Eutychian succeeds Felix I as the 27th pope of Rome.

=== 276 ===
==== By place ====
====== Roman Empire ======
- Emperor Tacitus doubles the silver content of the aurelianianus, and halves its tariffing to 2.5 d.c. They carry the value marks X.I.
- Tacitus campaigns successfully against the Goths who have invaded Asia Minor, and his half-brother, the praetorian prefect Marcus Annius Florianus, continues the campaign.
- Tacitus' cousin Maximinus administers Syria in a harsh manner, and is assassinated by local men of power, who are joined in the conspiracy by the faction responsible for having assassinated Aurelian in the previous year.
- Tacitus dies in Tyana, Cappadocia. He either dies of illness, or is murdered by the faction responsible for having assassinated Aurelian and Maximinus.
- Florianus becomes Roman Emperor with the support of the Senate, but a general in the east, Marcus Aurelius Probus, usurps power against him. Florianus breaks off his campaign against the Goths and marches east from the Bosporus with support from the Roman legions in Britain, Gaul, Spain and Italy.
- Florianus holds power for some weeks and fights indecisively against Probus in Cilicia, but his soldiers, many of whom are from the colder Rhine and Danube frontiers, suffer from heat and disease. He is overthrown and then assassinated by his own troops near Tarsus (Turkey), in collusion with Probus. Probus, age 44, is proclaimed new Emperor of Rome.
- Probus returns the aurelianianus to the tariffing of Aurelian.
- Probus invites the faction responsible for the murders of Aurelian and Tacitus to a banquet, only to massacre them. He then arrests a surviving conspirator and has him burned alive.

====== Sassanid Empire ======
- King Bahram I of Persia dies after a 3-year reign, in which the Zoroastrian priests at Ctesiphon (Iran) put pressure on him to persecute Buddhists, Christians, and Manichaeans. He is succeeded by his son Bahram II.

====== Asia ======
- Mahasena reigns in Ceylon. Orthodox and unpopular, he tries to introduce Mahayana Buddhism to the country.

=== 277 ===
==== By place ====
====== Roman Empire ======
- Emperor Probus travels with his army west across the Sea of Marmara (Turkey), and through the provinces of Thrace, Moesia, and Pannonia to defeat the Goths along the lower Danube. He acquires from the troops the title of Gothicus.
- Probus enters Rome, to have his position as Emperor ratified by the Senate.

====== China ======
- Tuoba Xilu succeeds his father Tuoba Liwei, as chieftain of the Tuoba clan.

=== 278 ===
==== By place ====
====== Roman Empire ======
- Emperor Probus defeats the Alamanni, advancing through the Neckar Valley. He expels the Franks from Gaul, and reorganizes the Roman defenses on the Rhine.
- Probus resettles the Germanic tribes in the devastated provinces of the Roman Empire. He adopts the titles of Gothicus Maximus and Germanicus Maximus.
- Piracy along the coast of Lycia et Pamphylia: The Romans besiege the city of Cremna (Pisidia) and kill the Isaurian robber Lydius.

=== 279 ===
==== By place ====
====== Asia ======
- Winter – Conquest of Wu by Jin: The Jin Dynasty conquers Eastern Wu, the last of the three contending powers in China during the Three Kingdoms Period. (Note: The Zizhi Tongjian recorded that the Jin dynasty launched the invasion of Eastern Wu in the 11th month of the 5th year of the Xianning era of Sima Yan's reign. This month corresponds to 21 December 279 to 18 January 280 in the Gregorian calendar.)

== Significant people ==
- Aurelian (Aurelianus)
- Claudius II Gothicus
- Quintillus
- Tacitus
- Florianus
- Probus

== Births ==
270

- March 15 – Saint Nicholas (Santa Claus) (d. 343)
- Liu Kun, Chinese general and poet (d. 318)
- Rabbah bar Nahmani, Babylonian 'amora
- Saint Spyridon, bishop of Trimythous (d. 348)

271

- Sima Wei, Chinese prince of the Jin Dynasty (d. 291)

272

- February 27 – Constantine the Great, Roman emperor (d. 337)
- Wei Shuo (or Mouyi), Chinese calligrapher (d. 349)

274

- Li Xiong, Chinese emperor of Cheng Han (d. 334)
- Shi Le, Chinese emperor of the Jie state (d. 333)

275

- Approximate date – Saint George of Lydda, Cappadocian Greek Roman soldier and Christian martyr (k. 303)

276

- Gregory the Elder, bishop of Nazianzus (approximate date)
- Guo Pu, Chinese historian, poet and writer (d. 324)
- Wang Dao, Chinese politician and statesman (d. 339)
- Yuan of Jin, Chinese emperor of the Jin Dynasty (d. 323)

277

- Justus of Beauvais, Gallo-Roman martyr (approximate date)
- Sima Ai, Chinese prince of the Jin Dynasty (d. 304)
- Zhang Mao, Chinese ruler of Former Liang (d. 324)

278

- Sima Yu, Chinese crown prince of the Jin Dynasty (d. 300)

279

- Sima Ying, Chinese prince of the Jin Dynasty (d. 306)

== Deaths ==
270

- Claudius II (Gothicus), Roman emperor (b. 214)
- Gregory Thaumaturgus, Christian bishop and theologian
- Luo Xian (or Lingze), Chinese general and politician
- Plotinus, Greek philosopher and founder Neoplatonism
- Qiao Zhou (or Yunnan), Chinese official and politician
- Quintillus, Roman emperor and brother of Claudius II
- Shapur I (the Great), ruler of the Sassanid Empire
- Shi Ji (or Zhu Ji), Chinese general and governor
- Sun Fen, Chinese prince of the Eastern Wu state

271

- Ding Feng, Chinese general and politician
- Domitian II, emperor of the Gallic Empire
- Felicissimus, Roman financial minister (rationalis)
- Hormizd I (or Ohrmazd), ruler of the Sassanid Empire
- Liu Shan, Chinese emperor of the Shu Han state (b. 207)
- Pei Xiu, Chinese official, writer, geographer and cartographer (b. 224)
- Sima Wang, Chinese general and prince of the Jin dynasty (b. 205)
- Victorinus, emperor of the Gallic Empire

272

- Shapur I (the Great), king of the Sassanid Empire
- Sabbas Stratelates, Roman general and martyr
- Sima Fu, Chinese prince and statesman (b. 180)
- Wan Yu, Chinese chancellor and politician

273

- June 1 – Reverianus, Christian bishop
- Callinicus, Greek historian and sophist
- Cassius Longinus, Greek philosopher
- Dexippus, Greek general and historian
- Hormizd I, king of the Sassanid Empire
- Septimius Antiochus, Roman usurper
- Wei Zhao, Chinese historian and scholar (b. 204)

274

- March 2 – Mani, prophet and founder of Manichaeism (b. 216)
- June 19 – Xun Yi (or Jingqian), Chinese official and politician
- August 25 – Yang Yan (or Qiongzhi), Chinese empress (b. 238)
- August/September – Lu Kang (or Youjie), Chinese general and politician (b. 226)
- September – Bahram I, king of the Sassanid Empire
- December 30 – Felix I, bishop of Rome
- Cao Fang, deposed Chinese emperor of the Cao Wei state (b. 232)
- After 274 – Septimia Zenobia, queen of the Palmyrene Empire (b. 240)

275

- c. November – Aurelian, Roman emperor (b. 214 or 215)
- Peroz I Kushanshah, ruler of the Sasanian Kingdom
- Approximate date – Septimia Zenobia, queen of the Palmyrene Empire (b. c. 240)

276

- Bahram I, king of the Sassanid Empire
- Marcus Annius Florianus, Roman emperor
- Marcus Claudius Tacitus, Roman Emperor
- Tiberius Julius Synges, Roman client king

277

- Tuoba Liwei, chieftain of the Tuoba clan (China)

278

- December 27 – Yang Hu (or Shuzi), Chinese general and politician (b. 221)
- Cao Yu (or Pengzu), Chinese prince of the Cao Wei state (b. 211)
- Fu Xuan (or Xiuyi), Chinese historian, poet and politician (b. 217)
- Xi Zheng (or Lingxian), Chinese essayist, poet and politician
- Yang Huiyu, Chinese empress of the Jin Dynasty (b. 214)

279

- Johanan bar Nappaha, Jewish compiler of the Talmud
- Tiberius Julius Teiranes, Roman prince and client king
- Tufa Shujineng, Chinese chieftain of Jin Dynasty

== Sources ==
- Sima Guang, ed. (1934) [1084]. Zizhi Tongjian. Hong Kong: Zhonghua Shuju.
