= 286 =

286 in various calendars
Gregorian calendar	286; CCLXXXVI
Ab urbe condita	1039
Assyrian calendar	5036
Balinese saka calendar	207–208
Bengali calendar	−308 – −307
Berber calendar	1236
Buddhist calendar	830
Burmese calendar	−352
Byzantine calendar	5794–5795
Chinese calendar	乙巳年 (Wood Snake); 2983 or 2776 — to — 丙午年 (Fire Horse); 2984 or 2777
Coptic calendar	2–3
Discordian calendar	1452
Ethiopian calendar	278–279
Hebrew calendar	4046–4047
- Hindu calendars
Vikram Samvat	342–343
Shaka Samvat	207–208
Kali Yuga	3386–3387
Holocene calendar	10286
Iranian calendar	336 BP – 335 BP
Islamic calendar	346 BH – 345 BH
Javanese calendar	166–167
Julian calendar	286; CCLXXXVI
Korean calendar	2619
Minguo calendar	1626 before ROC 民前1626年
Nanakshahi calendar	−1182
Seleucid era	597/598 AG
Thai solar calendar	828–829
Tibetan calendar	ཤིང་མོ་སྦྲུལ་ལོ་ (female Wood-Snake); 412 or 31 or −741 — to — མེ་ཕོ་རྟ་ལོ་ (male Fire-Horse); 413 or 32 or −740

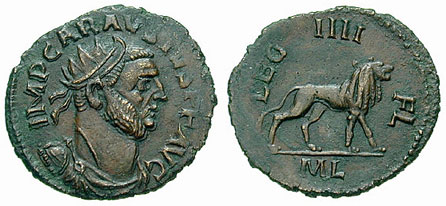
Carausius of Britain (r. 286–293)

Year 286 (CCLXXXVI) was a common year starting on Friday of the Julian calendar. At the time, it was known as the Year of the Consulship of Maximus and Aquilinus (or, less frequently, year 1039 Ab urbe condita). The denomination 286 for this year has been used since the early medieval period, when the Anno Domini calendar era became the prevalent method in Europe for naming years.

== Events ==
=== By place ===
==== Roman Empire ====
- Winter/Spring: The Caesar Maximian defeats the Bagaudae rebellion in Gaul. He then defeats a Germanic invasion into Gaul, defeating an army of Burgundians and Alemanni and another army of Chaibones and Heruli.
- Emperor Diocletian campaigns successfully against Sarmatian raids. The future emperor Constantius defeats the 'Bosporian Sarmatians'.
- April 1 – Diocletian rewards Maximian by elevating him to co-emperor, giving him the title Augustus.
- Summer: Carausius, commander of the Classis Britannica, is accused of piracy by Maximian and is sentenced to death. He responds by declaring himself emperor of Britain and Northwestern Gaul. His forces consist of the newly built Roman fleet and three legions in Britain. The Carausian Revolt is supported by Gaulish merchant ships and Frankish mercenaries.

==== Asia ====
- Tuoba Chuo succeeds his brother Tuoba Xilu as chieftain of the Tuoba clan.
- Chaekgye becomes king of the Korean kingdom of Baekje.

== Deaths ==
- Crispin and Crispinian, Roman cobblers and martyrs
- Domnina of Anazarbus, Christian martyr and saint
- Mark and Marcellian, Christian martyrs (approximate date)
- Tuoba Xilu, chieftain of the Tuoba clan (modern Mongolia)
