= 277 =

277 in various calendars
Gregorian calendar	277; CCLXXVII
Ab urbe condita	1030
Assyrian calendar	5027
Balinese saka calendar	198–199
Bengali calendar	−317 – −316
Berber calendar	1227
Buddhist calendar	821
Burmese calendar	−361
Byzantine calendar	5785–5786
Chinese calendar	丙申年 (Fire Monkey); 2974 or 2767 — to — 丁酉年 (Fire Rooster); 2975 or 2768
Coptic calendar	−7 – −6
Discordian calendar	1443
Ethiopian calendar	269–270
Hebrew calendar	4037–4038
- Hindu calendars
Vikram Samvat	333–334
Shaka Samvat	198–199
Kali Yuga	3377–3378
Holocene calendar	10277
Iranian calendar	345 BP – 344 BP
Islamic calendar	356 BH – 355 BH
Javanese calendar	156–157
Julian calendar	277; CCLXXVII
Korean calendar	2610
Minguo calendar	1635 before ROC 民前1635年
Nanakshahi calendar	−1191
Seleucid era	588/589 AG
Thai solar calendar	819–820
Tibetan calendar	阳火猴年 (male Fire-Monkey); 403 or 22 or −750 — to — 阴火鸡年 (female Fire-Rooster); 404 or 23 or −749

Year 277 (CCLXXVII) was a common year starting on Monday of the Julian calendar. At the time, it was known as the Year of the Consulship of Probus and Paulinus (or, less frequently, year 1030 Ab urbe condita). The denomination 277 for this year has been used since the early medieval period, when the Anno Domini calendar era became the prevalent method in Europe for naming years.

== Events ==
=== By place ===
==== Roman Empire ====
- Emperor Probus travels with his army west across the Sea of Marmara (Turkey), and through the provinces of Thrace, Moesia, and Pannonia to defeat the Goths along the lower Danube. He acquires from the troops the title of Gothicus.
- Probus enters Rome, to have his position as Emperor ratified by the Senate.

==== China ====
- Tuoba Xilu succeeds his father Tuoba Liwei, as chieftain of the Tuoba clan.

== Births ==
- Justus of Beauvais, Gallo-Roman martyr (approximate date)
- Sima Ai, Chinese prince of the Jin Dynasty (d. 304)
- Zhang Mao, Chinese ruler of Former Liang (d. 324)

== Deaths ==
- Tuoba Liwei, chieftain of the Tuoba clan (China)
