= 293 =

293 in various calendars
- Gregorian calendar: 293; CCXCIII
- Ab urbe condita: 1046
- Assyrian calendar: 5043
- Balinese saka calendar: 214–215
- Bengali calendar: −301 – −300
- Berber calendar: 1243
- Buddhist calendar: 837
- Burmese calendar: −345
- Byzantine calendar: 5801–5802
- Chinese calendar: 壬子年 (Water Rat); 2990 or 2783 — to — 癸丑年 (Water Ox); 2991 or 2784
- Coptic calendar: 9–10
- Discordian calendar: 1459
- Ethiopian calendar: 285–286
- Hebrew calendar: 4053–4054
- Hindu calendars
- Vikram Samvat: 349–350
- Shaka Samvat: 214–215
- Kali Yuga: 3393–3394
- Holocene calendar: 10293
- Iranian calendar: 329 BP – 328 BP
- Islamic calendar: 339 BH – 338 BH
- Javanese calendar: 173–174
- Julian calendar: 293; CCXCIII
- Korean calendar: 2626
- Minguo calendar: 1619 before ROC 民前1619年
- Nanakshahi calendar: −1175
- Seleucid era: 604/605 AG
- Thai solar calendar: 835–836
- Tibetan calendar: ཆུ་ཕོ་བྱི་བ་ལོ་ (male Water-Rat); 419 or 38 or −734 — to — ཆུ་མོ་གླང་ལོ་ (female Water-Ox); 420 or 39 or −733

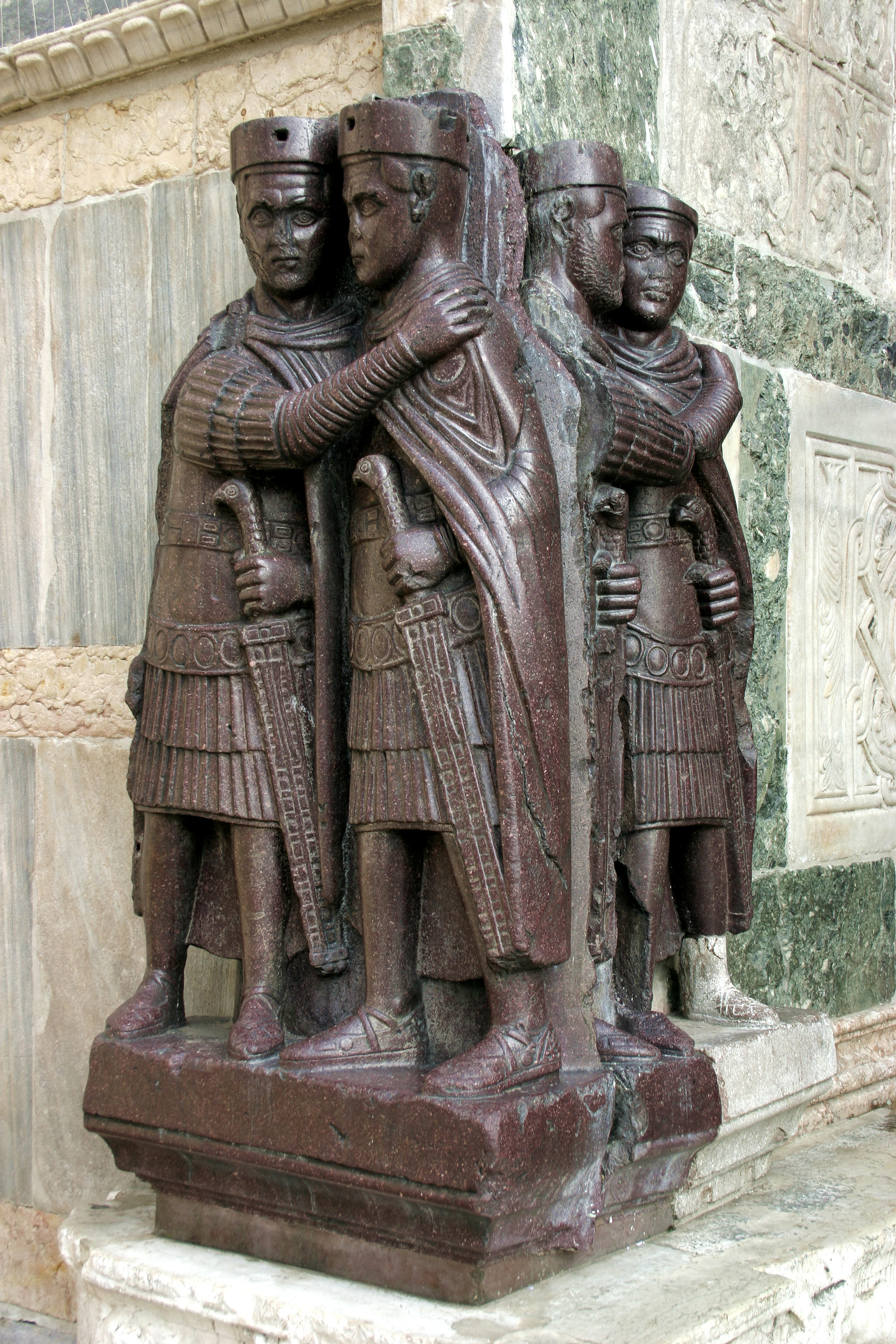
The four Tetrarchs, Venice

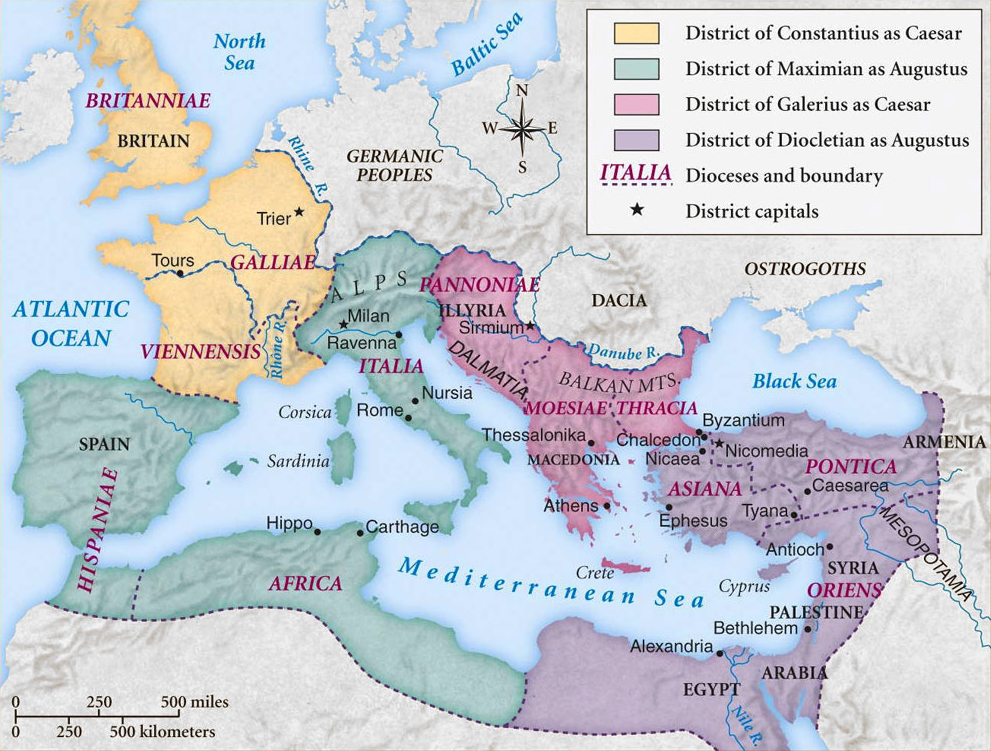
Map of the Roman Empire under the Tetrarchy (293)

Year 293 (CCXCIII) was a common year starting on Sunday of the Julian calendar. In the Roman Empire, it was known as the Year of the Consulship of Diocletian and Maximian (or, less frequently, year 1046 Ab urbe condita). The denomination 293 for this year has been used since the early medieval period, when the Anno Domini calendar era became the prevalent method in Europe for naming years.

== Events ==
=== By place ===
==== Roman Empire ====
- March 1 – Emperors Diocletian and Maximian appoint Constantius I and Galerius as Caesars. This is considered the beginning of the Tetrarchy, known as the Quattuor Principes Mundi ("Four Rulers of the World"). (Some sources and scholars date Galerius' elevation to May 21.)
- Constantius retakes some of the Gallic territories from the usurper Carausius. He conquers the crucial port of Bononia (modern Boulogne).
- Towards the end of the year, Carausius is murdered by his finance minister Allectus, who proclaims himself the new emperor of Britain.
- In this or the following year, Constantius defeats the Franks in Batavia (Netherlands).
- Galerius begins a series of two campaigns in Upper Egypt against the rebel cities of Coptos and Boresis as well as the Blemmyes and Meroitic Nubians.
- Over the course of his reign, but especially from the time of the Tetrarchy's creation, Diocletian divides the large provinces of the early empire into smaller administrative units, and he groups these new smaller provinces into dioceses. He also accelerates the third-century trend whereby the administration and military of the provinces are increasingly divided between governors and generals (duces) respectively, whereas formerly governors had also been in charge of the legions. This expansion of imperial personnel increases Diocletian's control over the empire and weakens the power of individual officials and officers. Moreover, Diocletian expands the retinues of the individual emperors to have more ministers and secretaries, thus establishing what will become known as the late Roman Consistorium.

==== Persia ====
- King Bahram II of the Persian Empire dies after a 17-year reign; his son Bahram III ascends to the throne. After four months, Bahram III's great-uncle Narseh, the king of Persarmenia, marches on the Persian capital Ctesiphon with the support of a faction of the nobility and the eastern Satraps. Bahram is overthrown and Narseh is declared the new King of Kings.

==== China ====
- Tuoba Fu succeeds his uncle Tuoba Chuo, as chieftain of the Chinese Tuoba Clan.

=== By topic ===
==== Religion ====
- Probus succeeds Rufinus, as Bishop of Byzantium.

== Deaths ==
- Bahram II, king of the Sassanid Empire
- Bahram III, king of the Sassanid Empire
- Carausius, Roman general and usurper
- Tuoba Chuo, Chinese chieftain of the Tuoba tribe
- Yuwen Mohuai, Chinese chieftain of the Yuwen tribe
