= Mogui =

Mogui may refer to:

- Mogwai, the Cantonese Chinese term for devil, ghost or evil spirit.
- Yuwen Mogui, the ancient Chinese chieftain of the Yuwen tribe.
