= Yuwen Qiubuqin =

Yuwen Qiubuqin (Chinese: 宇文丘不勤; pinyin: Yǔwén Qiūbùqín; Wade–Giles: Yü-wen Ch'iu-pu-ch'in, died c. 299) was a chieftain of the Yuwen tribe in the 290s. He married the daughter of the Tuoba leader Tuoba Chuo in 293, shortly after his father Yuwen Pubo became the chieftain (which followed the mutiny that killed Yuwen Pubo's brother Yuwen Mohuai). Yuwen Qiubuqin succeeded his father and was succeeded by his son Yuwen Mogui. Another son of his was Yuwen Quyun (宇文屈雲), who held important posts during Yuwen Mogui's reign.

Yuwen Qiubuqin Yuwen
Regnal titles
Preceded by Yuwen Pubo	Chieftain of the Yuwen ? – c. 299	Succeeded by Yuwen Mogui
