= Khao Sai On Archaeological Site =

Archaeological site in Lopburi, Thailand

Map of Lopburi Providence in Central Thailand

The Khao Sai On site is an archaeological site located in the Lopburi Province of central Thailand; findings at the site indicate metalworking dating as far back as the 1st millennium B.C.E in the South-Eastern Asian region. Archaeologists began excavating the site in 1988, and excavations of the site have continued over the years, with the last analysis of the site occurring in 2007. Excavations of the site have given archaeologists an insight into many aspects of the lives people living in the area such as their burial practices and their metalworking. The site serves as an important center for researching the early metalworking activities of Southeast Asia, and the artifacts discovered at the site display the importance of copper to the ancient people of the Khao Sai On site.

== Excavation ==
Excavation on the Khao Sai On Site began in 1988 by the Thai Italian Lopburi Regional Archaeological Project (Lo.R.A.P), with the intention of not only looking at the ancient history of the area but also by restoring the items discovered at the site, along with serving as an area to help preserve and promote local heritage awareness. The area was once subjected to looting, so a key goal of Lo.R.A.P. was transforming the site into a location of education in which the local people of the Lopburi can look to the site, to protect and value the cultural heritage of it.

=== Excavation Process ===
Before excavating the site, the area was systematically surveyed by the archaeologists. In order to survey the site, the archaeologists broke the site into 10 x 10m squares in which the surveyors were then able to walk in parallel lines throughout the site, recording which units had the highest density of artifacts such as slag and pottery shards. After surveying the site, the archaeologists then began excavating the site by digging trenches in areas of high artifact density, and analyzing the makeup of the stratum.

== Burial Practices ==
When excavating the site in 2006, archaeologists discovered several burial sites located deep in the soil, that demonstrated a shift in burial practices over time in the region. The earliest burial sites discovered include individuals being buried on top of a bed of broken pieces of pottery. The reasons behind why early burials contained remains being buried on pottery is still unknown, but more recent burial practices at the site do not follow the same pattern of breaking pottery in the grave.

== Evidence of Metal Working ==
When digging trenches throughout the site, archaeologists discovered evidence that metal production occurred in the area, as well as evidence of how the ancient people of the Khao Sai On site manufactured their metal. By examining the layers of soil of the site, archaeologists were able to discover areas of industrial deposit which were used as areas of disposal of metal works. The archaeologists were able to connect the industrial deposit sites to the use of metalworking, because these deposits included rocks containing copper ore, copper fragments, slag, charcoal, and terracotta works for refining the metal. Furthermore, around the site, located in the higher elevations of the surrounding mountains there is evidence of where the community mined for copper.

== Artifacts Discovered ==
Many of the artifacts discovered at the Khao Sai On Site display ways in which people were able to manufacture metal artifacts including: furnace-chimneys for smelting copper and terracotta molds used to mold the copper into tools.

=== Furnace-Chimneys ===
Discovered within the industrial deposit is a furnace-chimney made of terracotta which was used by the ancient civilization of Khao Sai On as a way of heating up copper so that it could be molded into tools. The furnace-chimney discovered at the site is the second one found throughout all of South Eastern Asia, and will be important for archaeologists to study how the technology spread throughout the surrounding regions.

=== Terracotta Molds ===
Also discovered at the site are terracotta casting molds. The terracotta molds discovered at the site were used as a way of taking the smelted down copper and molding it into ingots and tools, demonstrating the importance of metal to the people of the Khao Sai On Site because of its presence in tools.

== Bibliography ==
Ciarla, Roberto. “A Preliminary Report on Lo.R.A.P. Archaeological Excavations at Prehistoric Khao Sai On, Lopburi Province, Central Thailand.” East and West, vol. 57, no. 1/4, 2007, pp. 395–401. JSTOR, www.jstor.org/stable/29757737. Accessed 14 July 2020.

“File:Thailand Lopburi Locator Map.svg.” File:Thailand Lopburi Locator Map.svg - Wikimedia Commons, 2011, commons.wikimedia.org/wiki/File:Thailand_Lopburi_locator_map.svg.

Pryce, T. O., et al. “Intensive Archaeological Survey in Southeast Asia: Methodological and Metallurgical Insights from Khao Sai On, Central Thailand.” Asian Perspectives, vol. 50, no. 1/2, 2011, pp. 53–69. JSTOR, www.jstor.org/stable/42928783. Accessed 29 July 2020.
