= Bidzar =

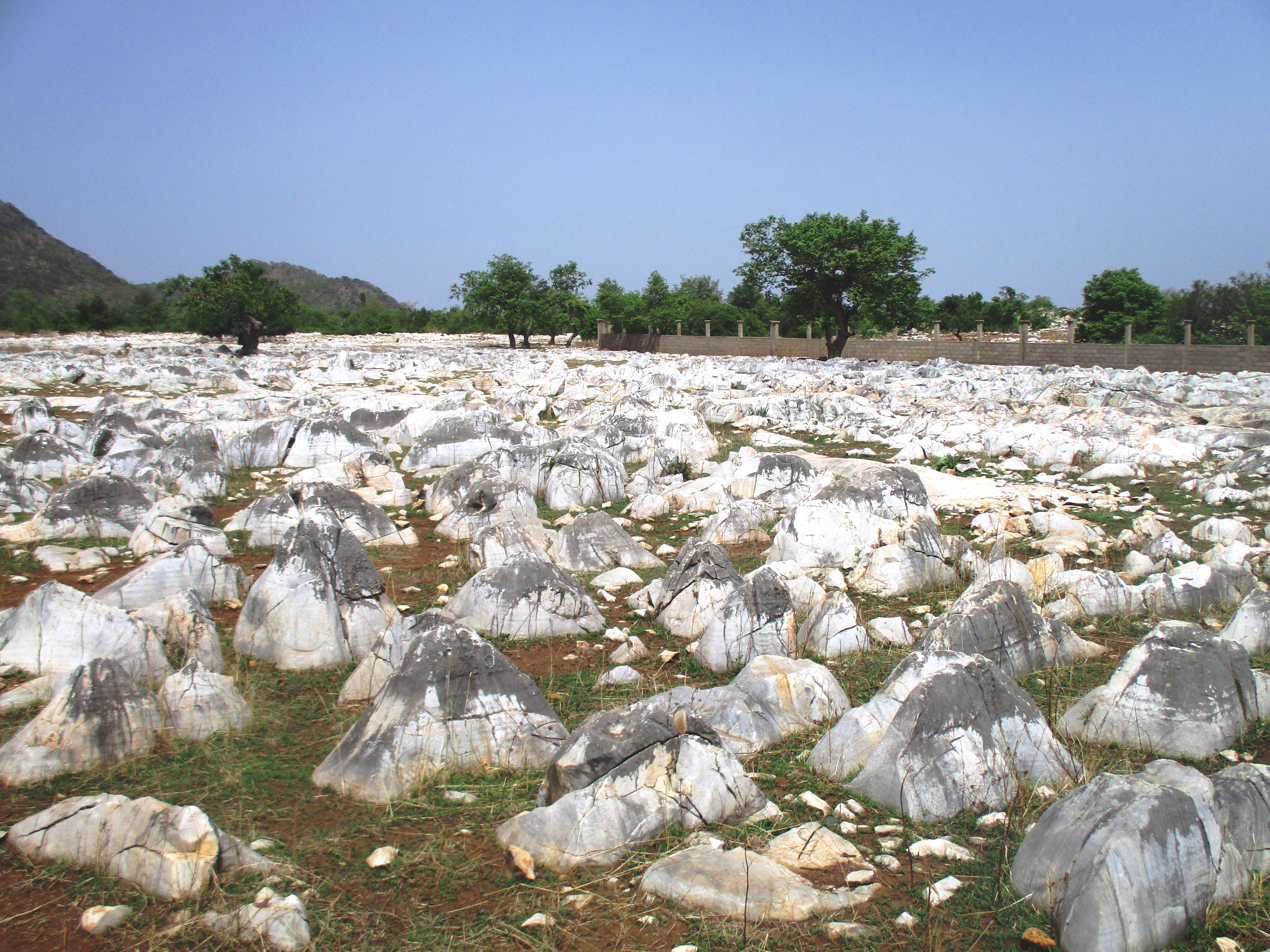
- Bidzar petroglyphs

- Location in Cameroon
- Country: Cameroon
- Province: North
- Department: Mayo-Louti
- Area code: 00237

Bidzar is an archaeological site 20 kilometres (12 mi) from Guider, Cameroon, featuring petroglyphs between 3,000 and 300 years old. The site, currently under threat from local cement and marble manufacturing operations, is being considered for inclusion in the UNESCO World Heritage list of sites with "outstanding universal value" to the world.

== Site Description ==
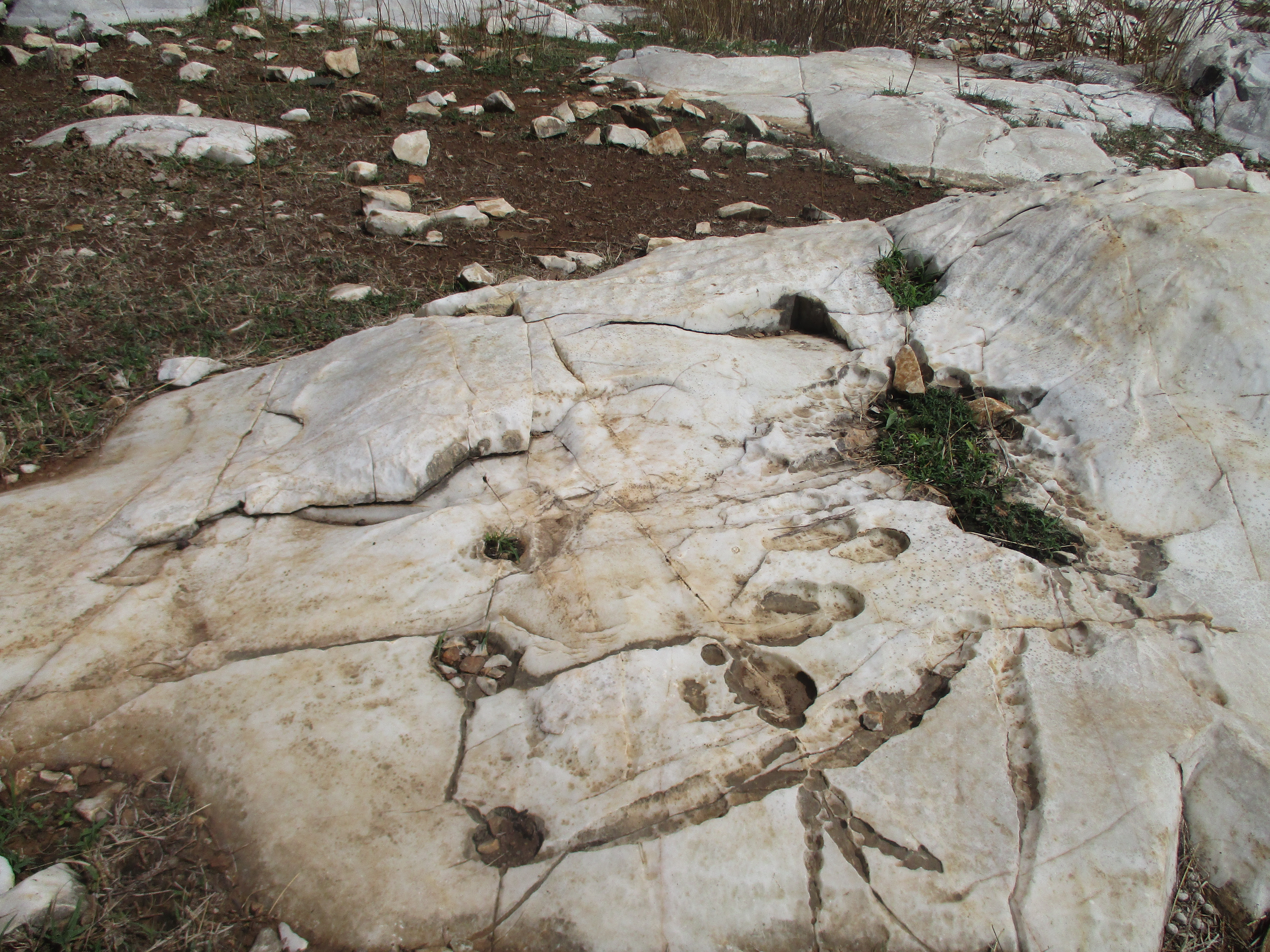
Bidzar archeological site towards Guider

The Bidzar petroglyphs are located near Bidzar village, on the Maroua-Garoua road toward Guider. An area of marble flagstone extending around the village circa 2.5 kilometres (1.6 mi) from north to south, and 1 kilometre (0.62 mi) from east to west displays around 500 engraved figures in total. The marble is of a calcareous type called cipolin; it has an ideal composition for engraving, having low resistance to friction and breaking easily. Figures were engraved into the marble using a hammer and an engraving tool. The figures are mostly geometrical, consisting of groups of circles, some isolated and some in groups. It has been speculated that the engraving represents concepts or stories from myths, or elaborate a cosmogeny.

== History ==
The age of the engravings has proven difficult to determine. Radiometric dating has produced a range of estimates, dating various carvings to between 300 and 3000 years of age.

The petroglyph site was discovered in 1933 by a French researcher named Buisson.

=== World Heritage Status ===
In the twentieth and twenty-first centuries, the calcareous marble on which the engravings stand has been extracted for use at nearby cement and marble factories. This activity endangers the engravings, which received provisional protection when the site was included in the Cultural category of the UNESCO World Heritage Tentative List, on April 18, 2006.

== Gallery ==
Bidzar petroglyphs

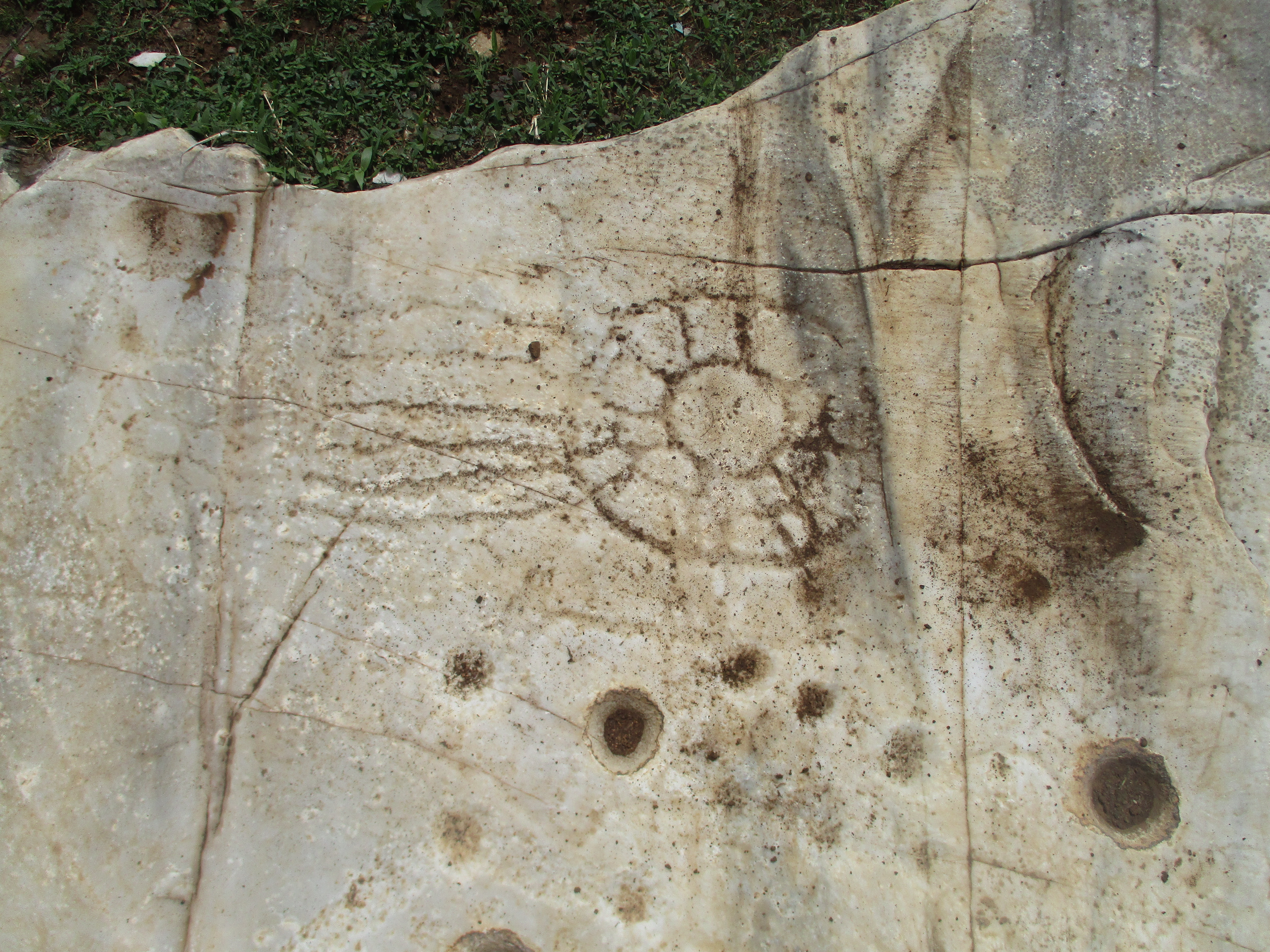

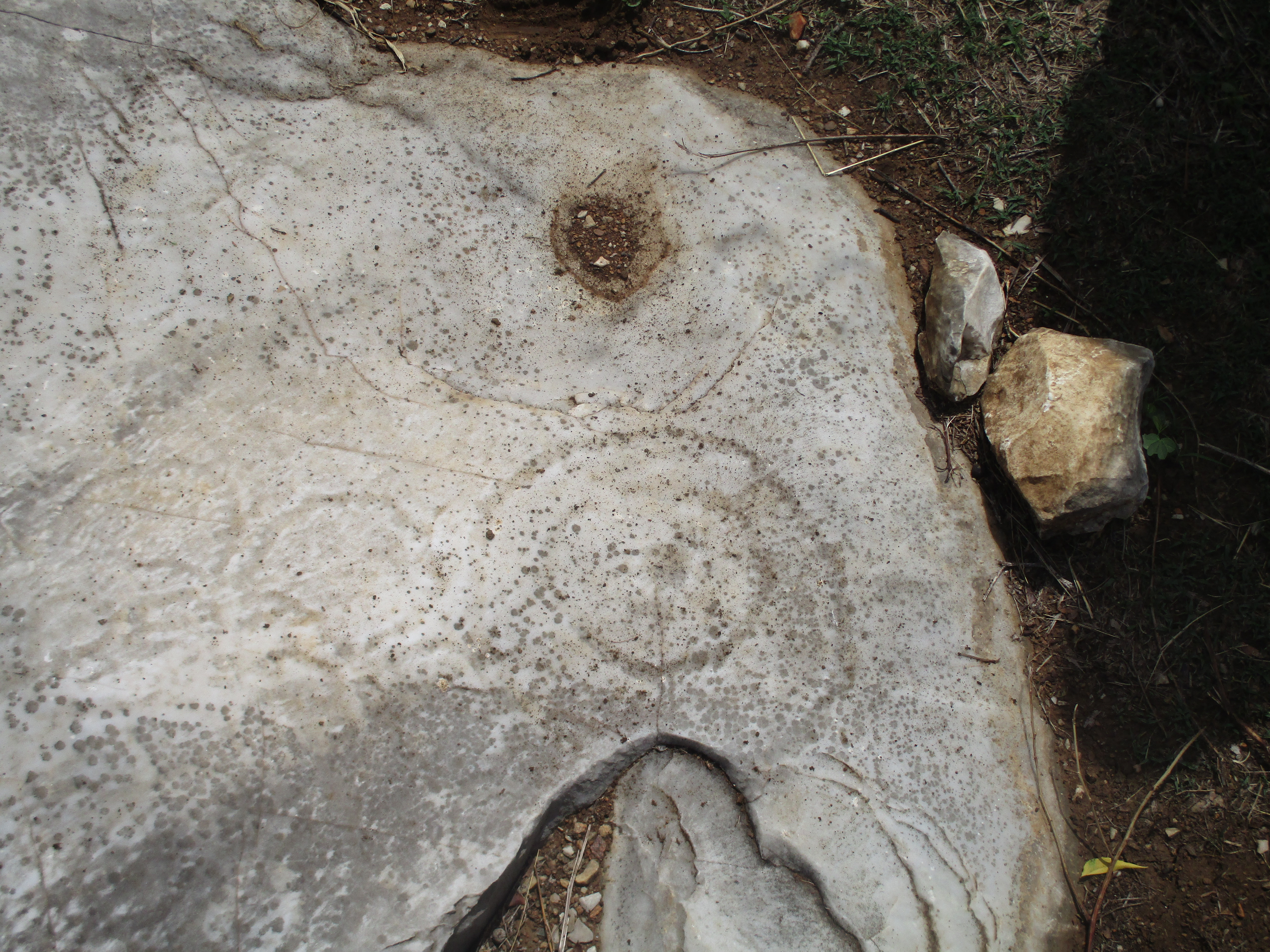

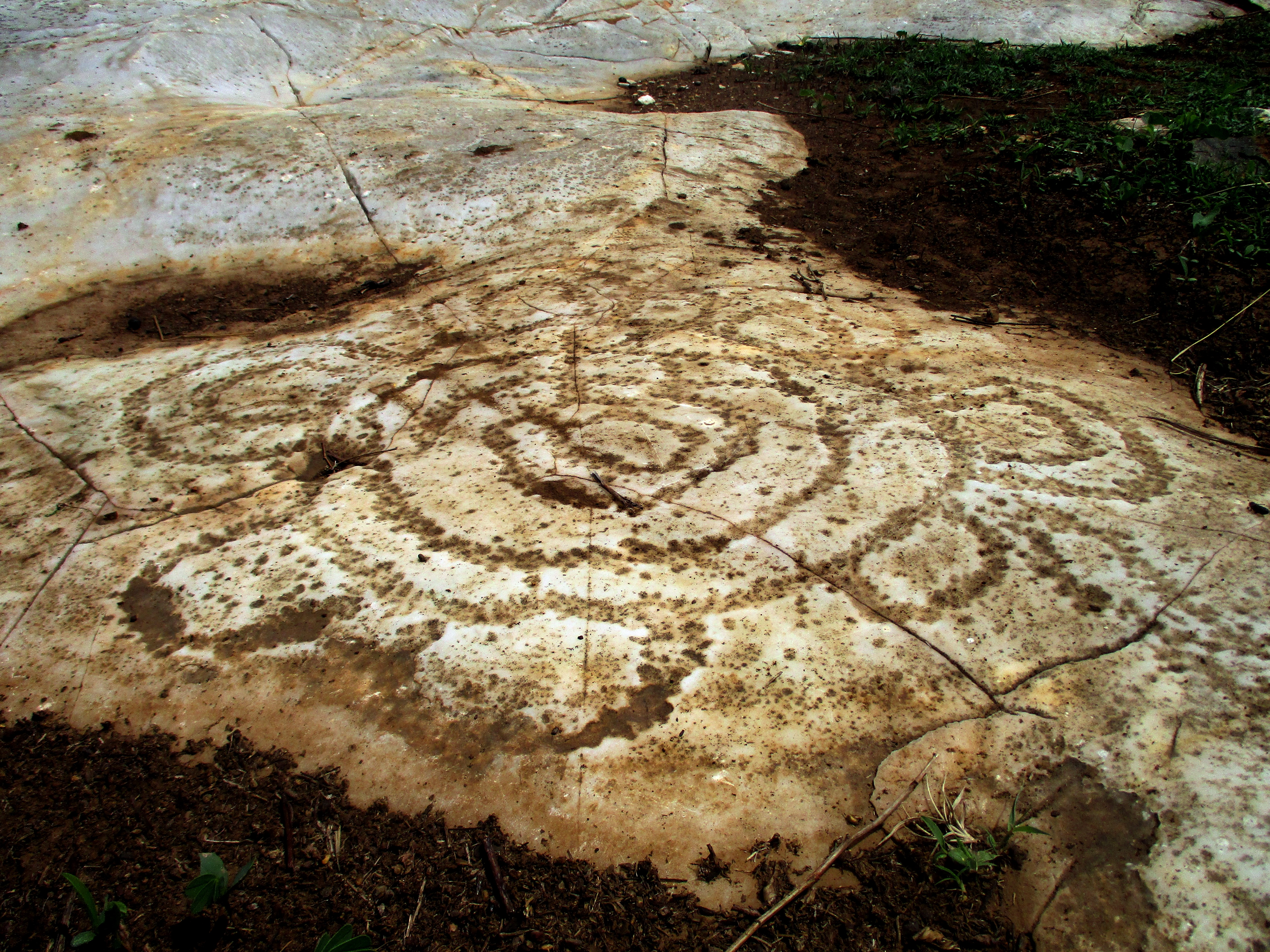

== See also ==
List of petroglyph sites
