= Yuwen Mogui =

Yuwen Mogui (Chinese: 宇文莫圭 or 宇文莫珪 or 宇文莫廆; pinyin: Yǔwén Mòguī; Wade–Giles: Yü-wen Mo-kuei, died after 302) was a chieftain of the Yuwen tribe. He succeeded his father Yuwen Qiubuqin as chieftain, likely in 299, and was succeeded by his son Yuwen Xunniyan. He waged frequent wars on the Murong and other tribes, and greatly expanded Yuwen's territory and prestige. Under his leadership, the Yuwen tribe controlled an area extending from modern Hebei in the west to Chaoyang, Liaoning in the east, including the Shira Muren and Laoha River valleys.

In 299, he entered into a marriage alliance with the Tuoba tribe, as his son Yuwen Xunniyan married Tuoba Luguan's eldest daughter. This alliance protected the Tuoba against incursions by the Murong tribe and their Duan allies.

In late 302, Yuwen Mogui took the title chanyu and dispatched a force led by his younger brother, Yuwen Quyun (宇文屈雲), to fight against the Murong chieftain Murong Hui. Yuwen Quyun was unsuccessful, so he recruited a tribal leader named Sunuyan (素怒延), possibly a Tuoba, to attack Murong Hui. Sunuyan besieged Murong Hui in his capital but, unable to conquer it, was eventually routed by the Murong army.

Yuwen Mogui Yuwen
Regnal titles
Preceded by Yuwen Qiubuqin	Chieftain of the Yuwen; 299–?	Succeeded by Yuwen Xunniyan
