= 348 =

348 in various calendars
- Gregorian calendar: 348; CCCXLVIII
- Ab urbe condita: 1101
- Assyrian calendar: 5098
- Balinese saka calendar: 269–270
- Bengali calendar: −246 – −245
- Berber calendar: 1298
- Buddhist calendar: 892
- Burmese calendar: −290
- Byzantine calendar: 5856–5857
- Chinese calendar: 丁未年 (Fire Goat); 3045 or 2838 — to — 戊申年 (Earth Monkey); 3046 or 2839
- Coptic calendar: 64–65
- Discordian calendar: 1514
- Ethiopian calendar: 340–341
- Hebrew calendar: 4108–4109
- Hindu calendars
- Vikram Samvat: 404–405
- Shaka Samvat: 269–270
- Kali Yuga: 3448–3449
- Holocene calendar: 10348
- Iranian calendar: 274 BP – 273 BP
- Islamic calendar: 282 BH – 281 BH
- Javanese calendar: 229–230
- Julian calendar: 348; CCCXLVIII
- Korean calendar: 2681
- Minguo calendar: 1564 before ROC 民前1564年
- Nanakshahi calendar: −1120
- Seleucid era: 659/660 AG
- Thai solar calendar: 890–891
- Tibetan calendar: མེ་མོ་ལུག་ལོ་ (female Fire-Sheep); 474 or 93 or −679 — to — ས་ཕོ་སྤྲེ་ལོ་ (male Earth-Monkey); 475 or 94 or −678

Year 348 (CCCXLVIII) was a leap year starting on Friday of the Julian calendar. At the time, it was known as the Year of the Consulship of Philippus and Salia (or, less frequently, year 1101 Ab urbe condita). The denomination 348 for this year has been used since the early medieval period, when the Anno Domini calendar era became the prevalent method in Europe for naming years.

== Events ==
=== By place ===
==== Europe ====
- Wulfila escapes religious persecution by the Gothic chieftain Athanaric, obtains permission from Constantius II to migrate with his flock of converts to Moesia, and settles near Nicopolis ad Istrum (Bulgaria).

==== Asia ====
- In Persia, women are enrolled in the army to perform auxiliary services.
- In India, Samudragupta of the Gupta Empire defeats Rudrasena in battle.

== Births ==
- Prudentius, Roman Christian poet (d. 413)
- Shenoute, monk and saint (d. 466)

== Deaths ==
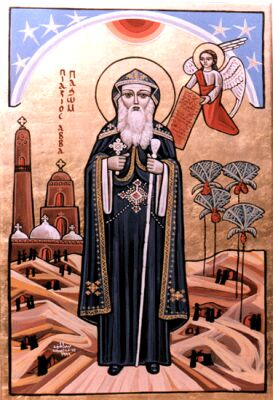
Saint Pachomius the Great

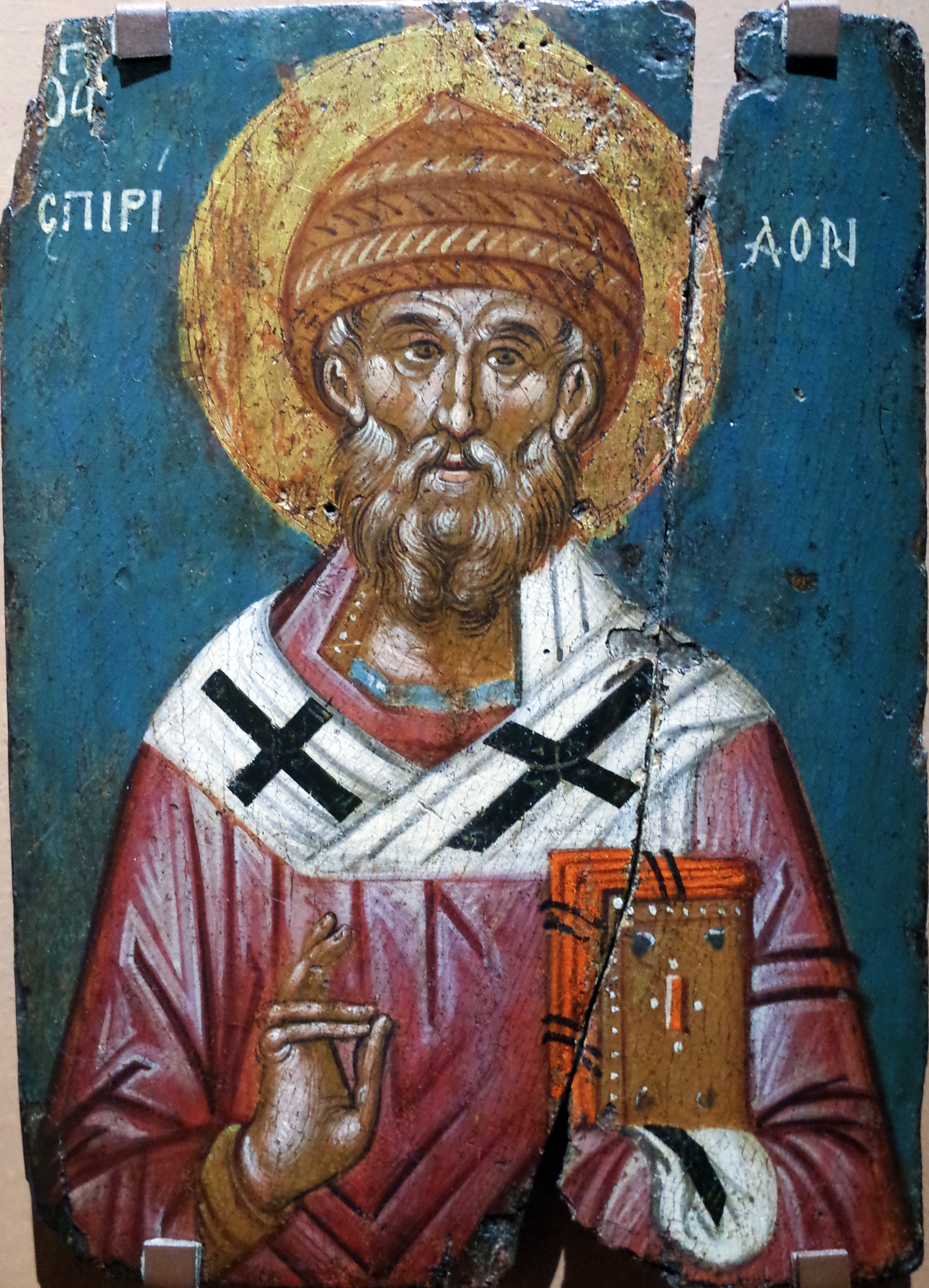
Saint Spyridon

- May 9 – Pachomius the Great, founder of Christian cenobitic monasticism (b. 292)
- December 12 – Saint Spyridon, Greek-Cypriot Orthodox bishop and saint (b. 270)

=== Date unknown ===
- Murong Huang, Chinese ruler of the Former Yan (b. 297)
