= 304 =

304 in various calendars
Gregorian calendar	304; CCCIV
Ab urbe condita	1057
Assyrian calendar	5054
Balinese saka calendar	225–226
Bengali calendar	−290 – −289
Berber calendar	1254
Buddhist calendar	848
Burmese calendar	−334
Byzantine calendar	5812–5813
Chinese calendar	癸亥年 (Water Pig); 3001 or 2794 — to — 甲子年 (Wood Rat); 3002 or 2795
Coptic calendar	20–21
Discordian calendar	1470
Ethiopian calendar	296–297
Hebrew calendar	4064–4065
- Hindu calendars
Vikram Samvat	360–361
Shaka Samvat	225–226
Kali Yuga	3404–3405
Holocene calendar	10304
Iranian calendar	318 BP – 317 BP
Islamic calendar	328 BH – 327 BH
Javanese calendar	184–185
Julian calendar	304; CCCIV
Korean calendar	2637
Minguo calendar	1608 before ROC 民前1608年
Nanakshahi calendar	−1164
Seleucid era	615/616 AG
Thai solar calendar	846–847
Tibetan calendar	ཆུ་མོ་ཕག་ལོ་ (female Water-Boar); 430 or 49 or −723 — to — ཤིང་ཕོ་བྱི་བ་ལོ་ (male Wood-Rat); 431 or 50 or −722

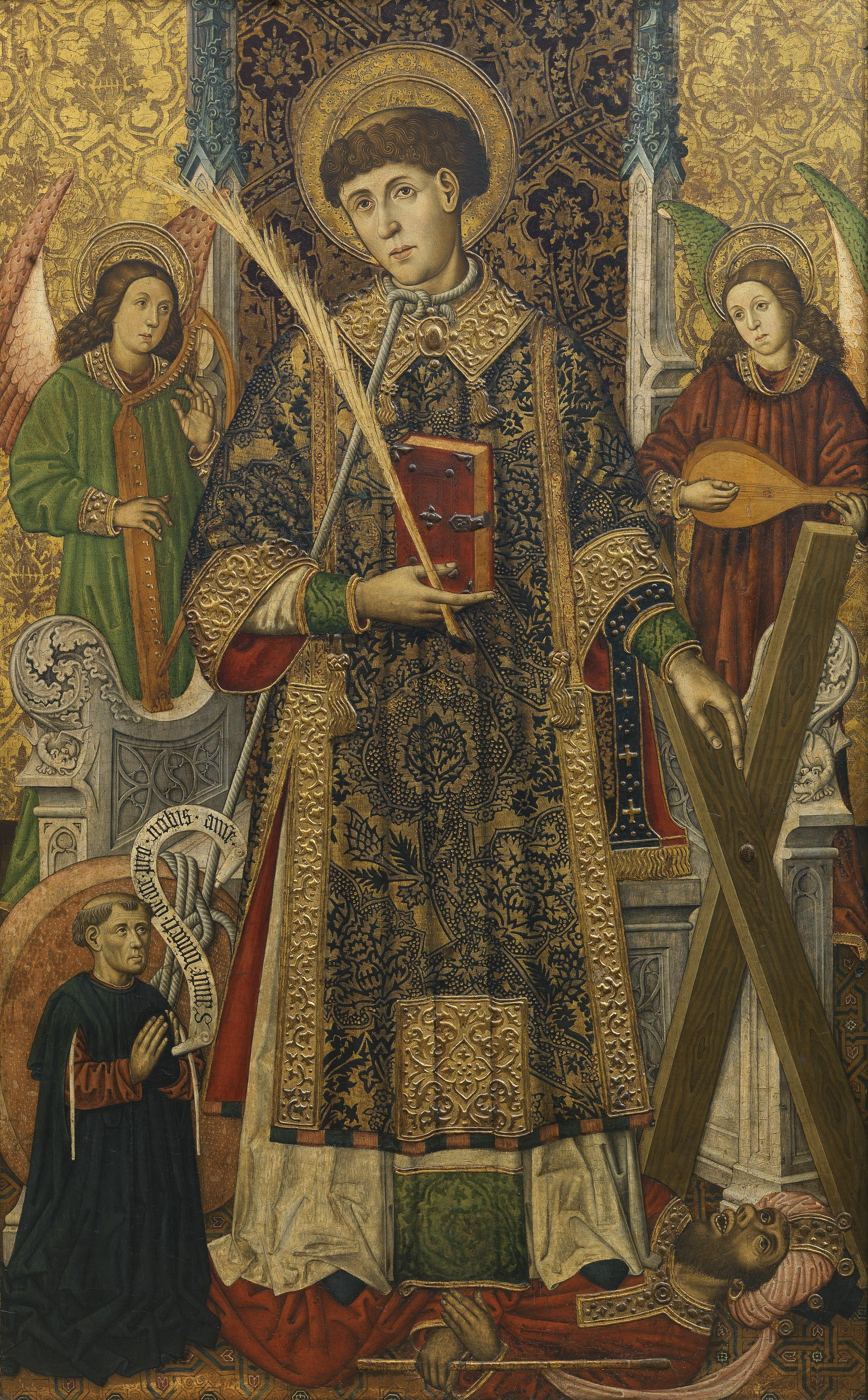
Saint Vincent of Saragossa

Year 304 (CCCIV) was a leap year starting on Saturday of the Julian calendar. It was known in the Roman Empire as the Year of the Consulship of Diocletian and Maximian (or, less frequently, year 1057 Ab urbe condita). The denomination 304 for this year has been used since the early medieval period, when the Anno Domini calendar era became the prevalent method in Europe for naming years.

== Events ==
=== By place ===
==== Roman Empire ====
- Caesar Galerius, perhaps accompanied by Emperor Diocletian, wins his fourth and final victory over the Carpi. Many of the surviving Carpi and Bastarnae are resettled in the Roman Empire, where they are split up. The Bastarnae are not attested after this time, and the Carpi are attested only once more in the 310s.
- Diocletian, while inspecting the Danube border, becomes seriously ill.
- Caesar Constantius I besieges a Germanic raiding force on an island in the Rhine and forces their surrender.

==== Asia ====
- Sixteen Kingdoms: The Xiongnu establishes the Han-Zhao state under Liu Yuan, often seen as the start of the Upheaval of the Five Barbarians.
- Cheng-Han earns its independence from Jin dynasty.
- Biryu becomes king of the Korean kingdom of Baekje.

=== By topic ===
==== Religion ====
- October 25 – Pope Marcellinus dies at Rome after an 8-year reign. The papal throne will remain vacant until 308.

== Deaths ==
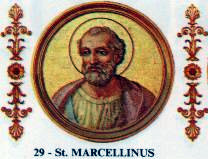
Pope Marcellinus

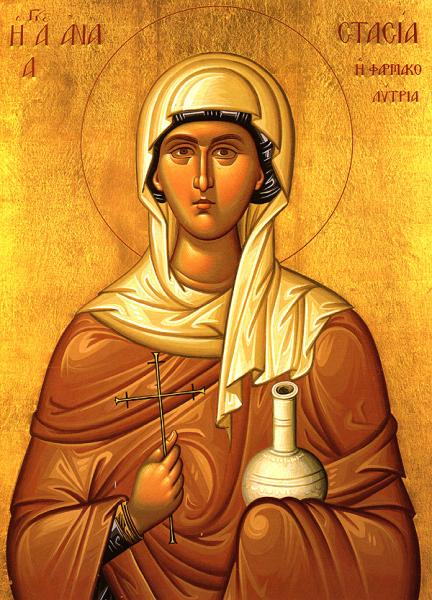
Anastasia

Note: Not all particulars of the Christian martyrs are supported by reliable historical evidence.

- January 21 – Saint Agnes of Rome (martyred by fire) (b. c. 291)
- March 19/20 – Sima Ai, Chinese prince of the Jin dynasty (executed) (b. 277)
- May 12 (or 303?) – Saint Pancras of Rome (martyred by beheading) (b. c. 289)
- c. October? – Bunseo of Baekje, king of Baekje (Korea) (assassinated)
- c. August 10 – Saint Philomena (martyred by beheading)
- October 25 – Pope Marcellinus
- December 25 – Saint Anastasia of Sirmium (martyred by beheading)
- Date unknown
  - Saint Afra (martyred by fire)
  - Saints Agape, Chionia, and Irene (martyred by fire and sword)
  - Saint Alban (martyred by beheading) (possibly 309)
  - Saint Florian (martyred by drowning)
  - Saint Gorgonius of Nicomedia (martyred)
  - Saint Juliana of Nicomedia (martyred)
  - Saint Lucy of Syracuse (martyred by fire and sword)
  - Saint Margaret the Virgin (martyred by beheading)
  - Saints Theodora and Didymus (martyred by beheading)
  - Saint Vincent of Saragossa (martyred)
