= Tuoba Chuo =

Chieftain of the Tuoba from 286 to 293

Tuoba Chuo (Chinese: 拓跋綽; pinyin: Tuòbá Chuò) (died 293), was chieftain of the Tuoba from 286 to 293. He was the son of Tuoba Liwei, and his brothers included Tuoba Shamohan, Tuoba Xilu, Tuoba Luguan. In 286 he succeeded Tuoba Xilu as chieftain of the Tuoba. In 293, the Yuwen chieftain Yuwen Mohuai was killed by his younger brother Yuwen Pubo, who usurped the position as chieftain of the Yuwen. Tuoba Chuo married his daughter to Yuwen Pubo's son Yuwen Qiubuqin. The same year Tuoba Chuo died, his nephew Tuoba Fu, son of Tuoba Shamohan, succeeded him as chieftain of the Tuoba.
