= Tuoba Liwei =

Leader of the Xianbei Tuoba clan from 219 to 277

Tuoba Liwei (Chinese: 拓跋力微; pinyin: Tuòbá Lìwéi) (174–277) was the first leader of the Tuoba-Xianbei tribe who lived during the Three Kingdoms period of China. He was the ancestor of the future Northern Wei dynasty and was thus posthumously honored as Emperor Shenyuan, with the temple name Shizu. Later, Emperor Wen of Western Wei changed his temple name to Taizu.

== Life ==
=== Background ===
Tuoba Liwei was the son of the chieftain, Tuoba Jiefen, and the Book of Wei describes him as being born with extraordinary talents. Despite his brother, Tuoba Pigu (also known as Tufa Pigu) being the eldest son, Liwei was chosen to succeed his father as supreme chieftain after his death.

=== Under the Moluhui tribe ===
In 220, Liwei's people were thrown into turmoil and dispersed due to attacks by other tribes from the west. Thus, he sought refuge under Dou Bin, the chieftain of the Moluhui tribe (没鹿回部).

Liwei and Dou Bin later attacked the western tribes, but were routed. During their retreat, Dou Bin lost his horse and was forced to flee on foot. Liwei noticed and gave up his horse to him, allowing him to safely escape. Once the dust settled, Dou Bin wanted to reward his saviour and ordered his subordinates to look for him, but Liwei refused to reveal his identity. When the secret was discovered, Dou Bin offered Liwei control over half of his domain, but was turned down, and so he married his daughter to him instead. Still, he continued to persistently asked Liwei for his wish, and in the end, Liwei requested that he be allowed to lead his tribe north and form a base along the Chang River (長川; in present-day Xinghe County, Inner Mongolia), which Dou Bin agreed. In the span of over a decade, Liwei's influence and reputation for virtue spread, and he regained the tribes he had previously lost.

In 248, when Dou Bin fell deathly ill, he advised his two sons, Dou Suhou (窦速侯) and Dou Huiti (窦回题), to serve under Liwei. However, the brothers secretly refused, and after his death, they instead plotted to have Liwei assassinated while he attended their father's funeral. Their plan soon leaked and reached Liwei, who then made his own plans to eliminate them first. He had his soldiers set up an ambush in the palace, and then the following morning kill Dou Bin's wife with a sword. After that, he sent a messenger on a fast horse to inform Suhou and Suti that their mother had suddenly died. The brothers were shocked and quickly rushed to their mother's funeral, where they were arrested and killed by Liwei and his men. Liwei annexed the tribes of the Moluhui, placing 200,000 soldiers under his command.

=== Cao Wei period ===
In 258, Liwei led his followers to occupy the abandoned Han city of Shengle in Dingxiang Commandery. Later that year, he held a ceremonial sacrifice to heaven, and leaders from various tribes came to attend. Only the chieftain of the Bai tribe (白部) hesitated to come. Consequently, Liwei conquered his tribe and killed him, making the other tribes fear and respect him.

At Shengle, Liwei began establishing friendly relation with the Chinese Cao Wei dynasty. He wrote to his chiefs, "I have seen Tadun and the Xiongnu of the past, who were greedy for wealth and plundered the frontier people. Though there were gains, they were not enough to compensate for the loss of lives. They made many enemies and impoverished the common people. This is not a long-term strategy." In 261, Liwei sent his son and crown prince, Tuoba Shamohan to observe the local Chinese customs as a hostage at the Wei capital, Luoyang, where he was treated as an honoured guest. Trade and exchange of gifts were constant between the Tuoba and Wei.

=== Western Jin period ===
In 265, Emperor Wu ascended the throne, replacing the Wei with the Western Jin dynasty. Liwei maintained friendly relations with the new regime. In 267, Shamohan asked to return to his tribe, citing his father's old age, which Emperor Wu permitted, sending him off with gifts.

In 275, Liwei sent Shamohan back to Jin to pay tribute. At the time, the Inspector of You province, Wei Guan, had been dealing with attacks from the Wuhuan and Tuoba people. He was also concern about Shamohan, who he believed had remarkable talents to stir up trouble in the future. After Shamohan completed his task, he attempted to return home with more gifts, but as he was passing through Bing province, Wei Guan requested permission from Emperor Wu to have him detained. The emperor was reluctant at first, not wanting to break his promise, but when Wei Guan further asked permission to distribute bribes among the Tuoba chiefs to sow discord and weaken them, he finally agreed.

When Shamohan was allowed to return in 277, Liwei sent the various chiefs to welcome him at the Yin Pavilion. At the banquet, Shamohan displayed his trick of killing a flying bird with only a flying pellet and a string. The Tuoba had never seen this practice before, and their chiefs expressed concerns among themselves that Shamohan had become too sinicized and would threaten their tradition if he were to take power. Thus, they began plotting to dispose him.

When Liwei asked the chiefs about his son, they said, "The Crown Prince is very talented. He can shoot down a flying bird with an empty bow. It seems that he had mastered the strange skills of the Jin people. This is a sign that chaos will befall our state and our people will be harmed. We hope that you be careful to observe." As Shamohan had been away for so long, Liwei started to show more favour to his other sons, and being over 100 years old at the time, he was confused by the statement of the chiefs. Suspicious, he declared, "Those who cannot be tolerated must be eliminated". The chiefs agreed and rushed to the border of Jin, where they forged an order to kill Shamohan. After Shamohan's death, Liwei deeply regretted his decision.

Liwei fell ill that same year. The King of the Wuhuan, Kuxian (庫賢) was a close and powerful friend of Liwei, but he had taken bribes from Wei Guan and wanted to break up the Tuoba. He brought an axe and whetstone into the court, and when asked by the chiefs, he said, "Your lord hated that you slandered and killed the Crown Prince. Now he wants to capture your eldest sons and kill them as well." The chiefs believed him and scattered.

Tuoba Liwei died soon after at the age of 104. He was succeeded by his son, Tuoba Xilu.

== Family ==
- Tuoba Shamohan (拓跋沙漠汗)
- Tuoba Xilu
- Tuoba Chuo
- Tuoba Luguan
