= Tuoba Xilu =

Tuoba chieftain from 277 to 286

Tuoba Xilu 拓跋悉鹿 Tuòbá Xīlù (died 286), was chieftain of the Tuoba from 277 to 286. His father was the Tuoba chieftain Tuoba Liwei, and his brothers included Tuoba Shamohan, Tuoba Chuo, and Tuoba Luguan. In 286, he was succeeded by his younger brother Tuoba Chuo as chieftain of the Tuoba.
