= Yuwen Mohuai =

Yuwen Mohuai (Chinese: 宇文莫槐; pinyin: Yǔwén Mòhuái) (?–293) was a chieftain of the Yuwen tribe who ruled from 260 to 293 CE.

According to the Book of Wei, he was associated with the eastern section of the Xianbei and traced his ancestry to a relative of the Southern Chanyu.

Yuwen Mohuai Yuwen Born: 260 Died: 293
Regnal titles
| Preceded by | Chieftain of the Yuwen; 260–293 | Succeeded by Yuwen Puhui |
