= Ab urbe condita =

Ancient Roman calendar era

Today (at UTC+00)
- Tuesday, 17 November 2026
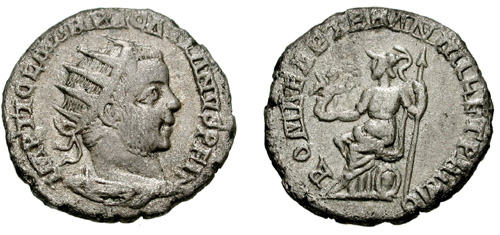
- Antoninianus of Pacatian, usurper of Roman emperor Philip in 248. It reads ROMAE AETER[NAE] AN[NO] MIL[LESIMO] ET PRIMO, 'To eternal Rome, in its 1,001st year.'
- Roman: Pridie Nonas Novembres, MMDCCLXXIX AUC
Other calendars
Akan	Kwabene
Armenian	30 Trē 1476
Aztec	Tlacaxipehualiztli 6, 13 Quiyahuitl
Babylonian	6 Arakhsamna, 2337 SE
Balinese pawukon	Menga, Beteng, Sri, Pon, Was, Anggara of Ukir, Sri, Ogan, Pandita
Bengali	2 Ogrohayon, BS 1433
Chinese	Yin Wood Goat・Tail Mansion; Fire Horse Year, Month 10, Day 9 (Lidong, 5 days until Xiaoxue)
Common Era	17 November 2026 CE
Coptic	8 Hathor, AM 1743
Egyptian	5 Pharmuthi, 2775 NE
Ethiopian	8 H̱edār, 2019 Amätä Məhrät
French Republican	Décade III, Sextidi de Brumaire de l'Année 235 de la République
Gregorian	17 November, AD 2026
Hebrew	7 Kislev, AM 5787
Hindu	Dhaniṣṭhā・Vṛddhi; Solar: 1 Mārgaśīrṣa, 1948 SE; Lunisolar: Aṣṭamī, Śukla pakṣa of Kārtika, 2083 VE; Rāudra・5127 KY・1,872,896
Icelandic	Þriðjudagur, 25 Gormánuður 2026
Islamic	6 Jumada al-thani, AH 1448 (using tabular method)
ISO week date	2026-W47-2
Japanese	9 Kannazuki, Reiwa 8 (Rittō, 5 days until Shōsetsu)
Julian	4 November, AD 2026 (AM 7535)
Julian day	2461362
Korean	9 Dwaejidal, 4359 DE
Maya	13.0.14.1.19; 12 Ceh, 13 Cauac
Solar Hijri	26 Aban, SH 1405
Tibetan	8 smin drug, me pho rta 2153 or 1772 or 1000

Anno ab urbe condita, rubricated and with a decorated initial, from the medieval Chronicle of Saint Pantaleon

Ab urbe condita (Latin: [ab ˈʊrbɛ ˈkɔndɪtaː]; 'from the founding of the City'), or anno urbis conditae (Latin: [ˈannoː ˈʊrbɪs ˈkɔndɪtae̯]; 'in the year since the city's founding'), abbreviated as AUC or AVC in Classical Latin inscriptions, expresses a date in years since 753 BC, the traditional founding of Rome. It is an expression used in antiquity and by classical historians to refer to a given year in Ancient Rome. In reference to the traditional year of the foundation of Rome, the year 1 BC would be written AUC 753, whereas AD 1 would be AUC 754. The foundation of the Roman Empire in 27 BC would be AUC 727. The current year AD 2026 would be AUC 2779.

Usage of the term was more common during the Renaissance, when editors sometimes added AUC to Roman manuscripts they published, giving the false impression that the convention was commonly used in antiquity. In reality, the dominant method of identifying years in Roman times was to name the two consuls who held office that year. In late antiquity, regnal years were also in use, as in Roman Egypt during the Diocletian era after AD 293, and in the Byzantine Empire from AD 537, following a decree by Justinian.

== Use ==
Prior to the Roman state's adoption of the Varronian chronology – created by Titus Pomponius Atticus and Marcus Terentius Varro – there were many different dates posited for when the city was founded. This state of confusion required picking a canonical founding date for one to use an AUC date. The Varronian chronology, constructed from fragmentary sources and demonstrably about four years off of absolute events c. 340 BC, placed the founding of the city on 21 April 753 BC. This date, likely arrived at by mechanical calculation but accepted with a variance of one year by the Augustan-era fasti Capitolini, has become the traditional date.

From the time of Claudius (r. AD 41–54) onward, this calculation superseded other contemporary calculations. Celebrating the anniversary of the city became part of imperial propaganda. Claudius was the first to hold magnificent celebrations in honour of the anniversary of the city, in AD 47, the eight hundredth year from the founding of the city. Hadrian, in AD 121, and Antoninus Pius, in AD 147 and AD 148, held similar celebrations respectively.

In AD 248, Philip the Arab celebrated Rome's first millennium, together with Ludi saeculares for Rome's alleged tenth saeculum. Coins from his reign commemorate the celebrations. A coin by a contender for the imperial throne, Pacatianus, explicitly states "[y]ear one thousand and first", which is an indication that the citizens of the empire had a sense of the beginning of a new era, a Sæculum Novum.

== Calendar era ==
The Anno Domini (AD) year numbering was developed by a monk named Dionysius Exiguus in Rome in AD 525 (AUC 1278), as a result of his work on calculating the date of Easter. Dionysius did not use the AUC convention, but instead based his calculations on the Diocletian era. This convention had been in use since AD 293, the year of the tetrarchy, as it became impractical to use regnal years of the current emperor. In his Easter table, the year AD 532 (AUC 1285) was equated with the 248th regnal year of Diocletian. The table counted the years starting from the presumed birth of Christ, rather than the accession of the emperor Diocletian on 20 November AD 284 or, as stated by Dionysius: "sed magis elegimus ab incarnatione Domini nostri Jesu Christi annorum tempora praenotare" ("but rather we choose to name the times of the years from the incarnation of our Lord Jesus Christ"). Blackburn and Holford-Strevens review interpretations of Dionysius which place the Incarnation in 2 BC, 1 BC, or AD 1.

The year AD 1 corresponds to AUC 754, based on the epoch of Varro. Thus:

Year		Event
AUC	BC/AD	Event
1	753 BC	Founding of Rome
244	510 BC	Overthrow of the Roman monarchy
259	495 BC	Death in exile of King Lucius Tarquinius Superbus
490	264 BC	Punic Wars
709	45 BC	First year of the Julian calendar
710	44 BC	The assassination of Julius Caesar
727	27 BC	Augustus became the first Roman emperor, starting the Principate
753	1 BC	Astronomical Year 0
754	AD 1	Approximate birth date of Jesus, approximated by Dionysius Exiguus in AD 525 (AUC 1278)
832	AD 79	Eruption of Mt. Vesuvius, and destruction of Pompeii and Herculaneum
901	AD 148	The emperor Antoninus Pius presided over the celebrations of the 900th anniversary of the founding of Rome.
1000	AD 247	999th Anniversary of the City of Rome
1001	AD 248	In April 248 AD (April 1001 AUC), the emperor Philip had the honour of leading the celebrations of the 1,000th anniversary of Rome.
1037	AD 284	Diocletian became Roman emperor, starting the Dominate
1229	AD 476	Fall of the Western Roman Empire to the armies of Odoacer
1246	AD 493	Establishment of the Ostrogothic Kingdom
1306	AD 553	Italy under Eastern Roman control
1507	AD 754	Foundation of the Papal States
1553	AD 800	Creation of the Holy Roman Empire
1824	AD 1071	Defeat of the Eastern Romans at the Battle of Manzikert
1930	AD 1177	Papal States became independent from the Holy Roman Empire
1957	AD 1204	Sack of Constantinople by the Crusaders
2001	AD 1248	2,000th Anniversary of the City of Rome
2014	AD 1261	Recovery of Constantinople by the Eastern Romans
2206	AD 1453	Fall of the Eastern Roman Empire. Ottoman sultan Mehmed II claimed the title caesar of Rome (Ottoman Turkish: قیصر روم, romanized: qayṣar-i rūm)
2335	AD 1582	First year of the Gregorian calendar
2247–2312	AD 1494–1559	Italian Wars
2545–2554	AD 1792–1801	Italian campaigns of the French Revolutionary Wars
2556–2568	AD 1803–1815	Napoleonic Wars
2574–2583	AD 1820–1829	Greek War of Independence. The dominant self-identity of the Greeks was still Rhōmaîoi or Romioi.
2576	AD 1822	Proclamation of the First Hellenic Republic
2585	AD 1832	Foundation of the Kingdom of Greece
2601–2624	AD 1848–1871	Italian unification, also known as the Risorgimento (Italian: 'Resurgence')
2614	AD 1861	Foundation of the Kingdom of Italy
2667–2671	AD 1914–1918	World War I
2672-2675	AD 1919–1922	Greco-Turkish War
2675	AD 1922	Abolition of the Ottoman sultanate (Note: Urban Ottoman Turks identified as *Rûmî* (meaning "Romans") during the 15th, 16th, and 17th centuries; however, from the 18th century onwards, this identification fell out of use among Turks, who began to apply the term exclusively to the Greek and Christian population of the Ottoman Empire. With the abolition of the sultanate, the Turkish sultans' claim to the title of Caesars of Rome was also abolished.)
2676	AD 1923	Population exchange between Greece and Turkey
2677	AD 1924	Proclamation of the Second Hellenic Republic
2682	AD 1929	Creation of the Sovereign City-State of the Vatican
2688	AD 1936	Restoration of the Kingdom of Greece
2692–2698	AD 1939–1945	World War II
2699	AD 1946	Proclamation of the Italian Republic
2711	AD 1958	Italy joined the European Union.
2727	AD 1974	Proclamation of the Third Hellenic Republic.
2734	AD 1981	Greece joined the European Union.
2778	AD 2025	Last year
2779	AD 2026	Current year
2780	AD 2027	Next year

== See also ==
- Calendar era
- History of Italy
- History of Greece
- List of Latin phrases
- Roman calendar
