= List of Epicurean philosophers =

This is a list of Epicurean philosophers, ordered (roughly) by date. See also Category:Epicurean philosophers.

Name	Period	Notes
3rd century BC
Epicurus	341–270 BC	Founder of the Epicurean school of philosophy.
Polyaenus of Lampsacus	c. 345 – c. 285 BC	Mathematician and friend of Epicurus.
Metrodorus of Lampsacus	331–278 BC	Close friend of Epicurus.
Hermarchus	c. 325–c. 250 BC	Second leader of the Epicurean school.
Carneiscus	c. 300 BC	Epicurean who wrote a work on friendship.
Colotes of Lampsacus	c. 320–c. 250 BC	Friend of Epicurus who wrote a work criticizing the doctrines of other schools.
Idomeneus of Lampsacus	c. 325–c. 250 BC	Friend and pupil of Epicurus. Biographer of famous lives.
Batis of Lampsacus	c. 300 BC	Pupil of Epicurus. Sister of Metrodorus, wife of Idomenus.
Timocrates of Lampsacus	fl. 300 BC	Brother of Metrodorus, and apostate of Epicureanism.
Pythocles	c. 300 BC	Pupil of Epicurus.
Neocles	c. 300 BC	Brother and pupil of Epicurus.
Chaeridemus	c. 300 BC	Brother and pupil of Epicurus.
Aristobulus	c. 300 BC	Brother and pupil of Epicurus.
Leontion	fl. 300 BC	Philosopher who criticized Theophrastus
Boidion	fl. 300 BC	Pupil of Epicurus
Demetria	fl. 300 BC	Pupil of Epicurus
Hedeia	fl. 300 BC	Pupil of Epicurus
Mammarion	fl. 300 BC	Pupil of Epicurus
Leonteus of Lampsacus	c. 300 BC	Pupil of Epicurus.
Themista of Lampsacus	c. 300 BC	Pupil of Epicurus.
Polystratus	c. 290–219 BC	Third leader of the Epicurean school.
Dionysius of Lamptrai	c. 275–205 BC	Fourth leader of the Epicurean school.
Basilides	c. 250–c. 175 BC	Fifth leader of the Epicurean school.
2nd century BC
Philonides of Laodicea	c. 200–c. 130 BC	Epicurean philosopher who lived at the Seleucid court.
Diogenes of Tarsus	fl. 150 BC	Epicurean philosopher and author.
Diogenes of Seleucia	fl. 150 BC	Epicurean philosopher, lived at the court of Syria.
Alcaeus and Philiscus	fl. 150 BC	Epicurean philosophers expelled from Rome in 173 or 154 BC.
Apollodorus	fl. 125 BC	Leader of the Epicurean school, teacher of Zeno of Sidon.
Demetrius Lacon	c. 150–c. 75 BC	Epicurean philosopher and writer.
Zeno of Sidon	c. 150–c. 75 BC	Epicurean philosopher, and teacher of Philodemus.
Gaius Amafinius	fl. 125 BC	Epicurean philosopher who introduced Epicureanism to Rome.
Titus Albucius	fl. 105 BC	Orator and politician.
1st century BC
Rabirius	fl. 100 BC	Writer of Epicurean texts in Latin.
Phaedrus	138–70 BC	Leader of the Epicurean school.
Philodemus	c. 110–c. 40 BC	Epicurean philosopher whose works survive in the Villa of the Papyri.
Lucretius	c. 95–c. 55 BC	Epicurean philosopher-poet who composed De rerum natura.
Patro	fl. 70 BC	Leader of the Epicurean school.
Catius	fl. 50 BC	Epicurean philosopher, wrote Latin books.
Titus Pomponius Atticus	c. 110 BC–c. 33 BC	Banker and patron of letters.
Siro	fl. 50 BC	Epicurean philosopher and teacher of Virgil.
2nd century AD
Diogenes of Oenoanda	fl. 125 AD	Epicurean who carved Epicurus's teachings on a wall in Oenoanda.

== See also ==
- List of ancient Greek philosophers
- List of ancient Platonists
- List of Cynic philosophers
- List of Stoic philosophers
