= Epicurus =

Ancient Greek philosopher (341–270 BC)

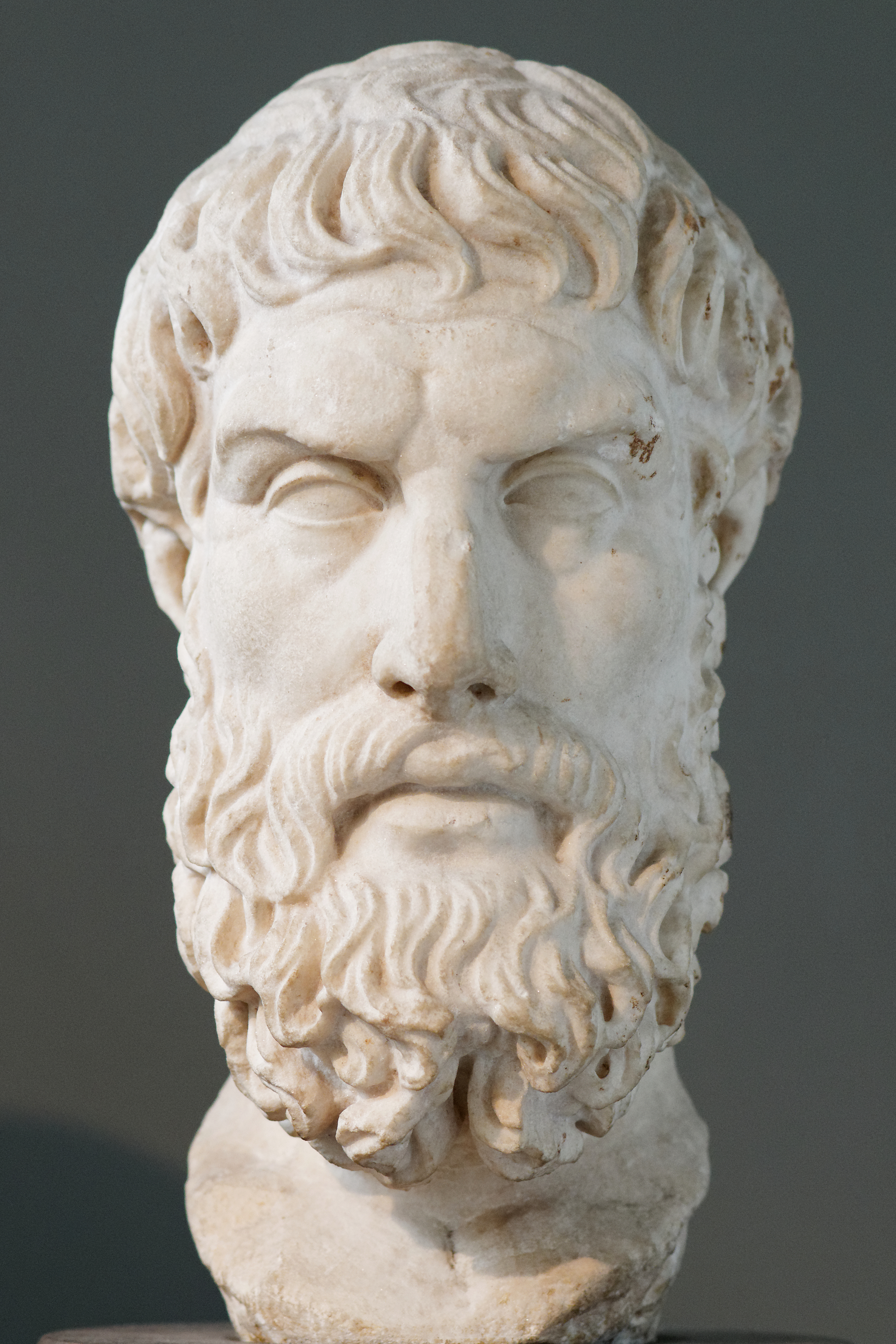
- Roman marble bust of Epicurus
- Born: February 341 BC; Samos, Greece
- Died: 270 BC (aged about 72); Athens, Greece

Philosophical work
- Era: Hellenistic philosophy
- Region: Western philosophy
- School: Epicureanism
- Main interests: Ethics; epistemology; physics; theology
- Notable ideas: Ataraxia; Aponia; "Moving" and "static" pleasures; Attributed: Epicurean paradox

Epicurus (/ˌɛpɪˈkjʊərəs/, EH-pih-KURE-əs; Ancient Greek: Ἐπίκουρος Epikouros; 341–270 BC) was an ancient Greek philosopher who founded the philosophical school of Epicureanism, which teaches that management of one's desires, removal of unnecessary fears, friendship, and virtuous living lead to a pleasant life and constant happiness, the highest good.

Epicurus advocated that people were best able to pursue philosophy by living a self-sufficient life surrounded by friends; he and his followers were known for eating simple meals and discussing a wide range of philosophical subjects at "The Garden", the school he established in Athens. Epicurus taught that although the gods exist, they have no involvement in human affairs. Like the earlier philosopher Democritus, Epicurus claimed that all occurrences in the natural world are ultimately the result of tiny, invisible particles known as atoms moving and interacting in empty space, though Epicurus also deviated from Democritus by proposing the idea of atomic "swerve", which holds that atoms may deviate from their expected course, thus permitting humans to possess free will in an otherwise deterministic universe.

Of the over 300 works Epicurus is said to have written about various subjects, the vast majority have been lost. Only a few letters and a collection of quotes—the Principal Doctrines—have survived intact, along with several fragments of his other writings, such as his major work On Nature. Most information about his philosophy comes through later authors, such as Lucretius and Diogenes of Oenoanda.

Epicureanism reached the height of its popularity during the late years of the Roman Republic, but by late antiquity, it had died out. Throughout the Middle Ages, Epicurus was popularly, though inaccurately, remembered as a patron of drunkards, whoremongers, and gluttons. His teachings gradually became more widely known in the fifteenth century with the rediscovery of important texts, but his ideas did not become acceptable until the seventeenth century, when the French Catholic priest Pierre Gassendi revived a modified version of them, which was promoted by other writers, including Walter Charleton and Robert Boyle. His influence grew considerably during and after the Enlightenment, impacting the ideas of major thinkers, including John Locke and Karl Marx.

== Life ==
=== Upbringing and influences ===
Map of Greece showing locations associated with Epicurus

Epicurus was born in the Athenian settlement on the Aegean island of Samos in February 341 BC. His parents, Neocles and Chaerestrate, were both Athenian-born, and his father was an Athenian citizen. Epicurus grew up during the final years of the Greek Classical Period. Plato had died seven years before Epicurus was born and Epicurus was seven years old when Alexander the Great crossed the Hellespont into Persia. As a child, Epicurus would have received a typical ruling-class ancient Greek education. Epicurus is known to have studied under the instruction of a Samian Platonist named Pamphilus, probably for about four years. His Letter of Menoeceus and surviving fragments of his other writings strongly suggest that he had extensive training in rhetoric. After the death of Alexander the Great, Perdiccas expelled the Athenian settlers on Samos to Colophon, on the coast of what is now Turkey. Epicurus joined his family there after the completion of his military service. He studied under Nausiphanes, who followed the teachings of Democritus.

Epicurus's teachings were heavily influenced by those of earlier philosophers, particularly Democritus. Nonetheless, Epicurus differed from his predecessors on several key points of determinism and vehemently denied having been influenced by any previous philosophers, whom he denounced as "confused". Instead, he insisted that he had been "self-taught".

According to DeWitt, Epicurus's teachings also show influences from the contemporary philosophical school of Cynicism. The Cynic philosopher Diogenes of Sinope was still alive when Epicurus would have been in Athens for his required military training and it is possible they met. Diogenes's pupil Crates of Thebes (c. 365 – c. 285 BC) was a close contemporary of Epicurus. Epicurus agreed with the Cynics' quest for honesty, but rejected their "insolence and vulgarity", instead teaching that honesty must be coupled with courtesy and kindness. Epicurus shared this view with his contemporary, the comic playwright Menander.

Epicurus's Letter to Menoeceus, possibly an early work of his, is written in an eloquent style similar to that of the Athenian rhetorician Isocrates (436–338 BC), but, for his later works, he seems to have adopted the bald, intellectual style of the mathematician Euclid. Epicurus's epistemology also bears an unacknowledged debt to the later writings of Aristotle (384–322 BC), who rejected the Platonic idea of hypostatic Reason and instead relied on nature and empirical evidence for knowledge about the universe. During Epicurus's formative years, Greek knowledge about the rest of the world was rapidly expanding due to the Hellenization of the Near East and the rise of Hellenistic kingdoms. Epicurus's philosophy was consequently more universal in its outlook than those of his predecessors, since it took cognizance of non-Greek peoples as well as Greeks. He may have had access to the now-lost writings of the historian and ethnographer Megasthenes, who wrote during the reign of Seleucus I Nicator (ruled 305–281 BC).

=== Teaching career ===
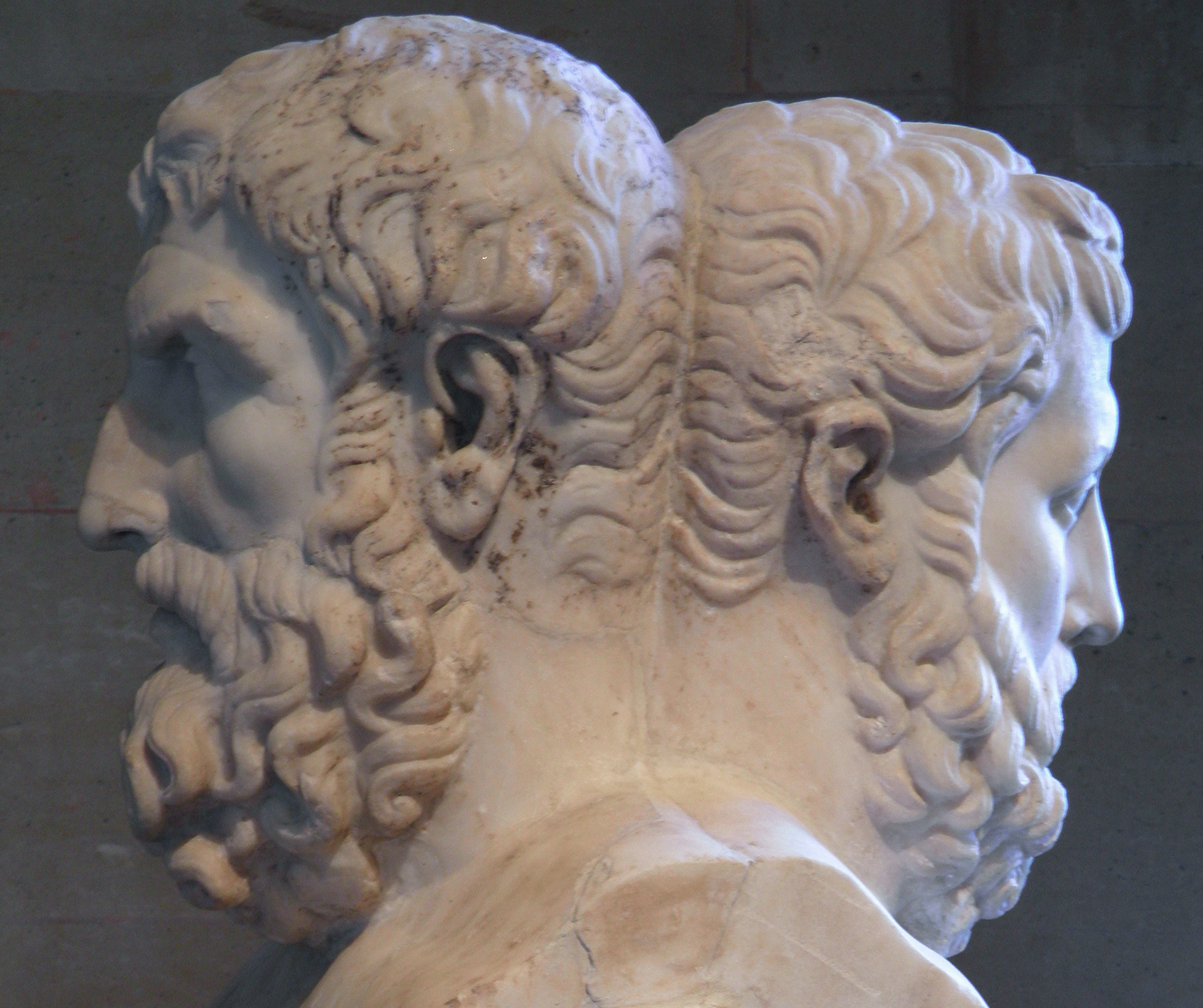
Herm of Epicurus (left) leaning against his disciple Metrodorus in the Louvre Museum

During Epicurus's lifetime, Platonism was the dominant philosophy in higher education. Epicurus's opposition to Platonism formed a large part of his thought. Over half of the forty Principal Doctrines of Epicureanism are flat contradictions of Platonism. In around 311 BC, Epicurus, when he was around thirty years old, began teaching in Mytilene. Around this time, Zeno of Citium, the founder of Stoicism, arrived in Athens, at the age of about twenty-one, but Zeno did not begin teaching what would become Stoicism for another twenty years. Although later texts, such as the writings of the first-century BC Roman orator Cicero, portray Epicureanism and Stoicism as rivals, this rivalry seems to have only emerged after Epicurus's death.

Epicurus's teachings caused strife in Mytilene and he was forced to leave. He then founded a school in Lampsacus before returning to Athens in c. 306 BC, where he remained until his death. There he founded The Garden (κῆπος), a school named for the garden he owned that served as the school's meeting place, about halfway between the locations of two other schools of philosophy, the Stoa and the Academy.

Philodemus of Gadara lists four "guides" (hoi kathēgemones) of the first generation of the Garden who worked to establish its fundamental principles: Metrodorus, Hermarchus, Polyaneus, and Epicurus himself. Other disciples of Epicurus whose doctrines are known include Colotes, whose work On the Impossibility of Living According to the Doctrines of Other Philosophers was disputed in two extant works by Plutarch, and Carneiscus, whose work criticizing the peripatetic conception of friendship survives in a fragmentary state. Other students include Idomeneus, Pythocles, and Epicurus's three brothers: Neocles, Chaeridemus, and Aristobulus. The Garden also welcomed many female students during Epicurus's tenure, including Themista, Batis, Boidion, Demetria, Hedeia, Leontion, Mammarion, and Nikidion.

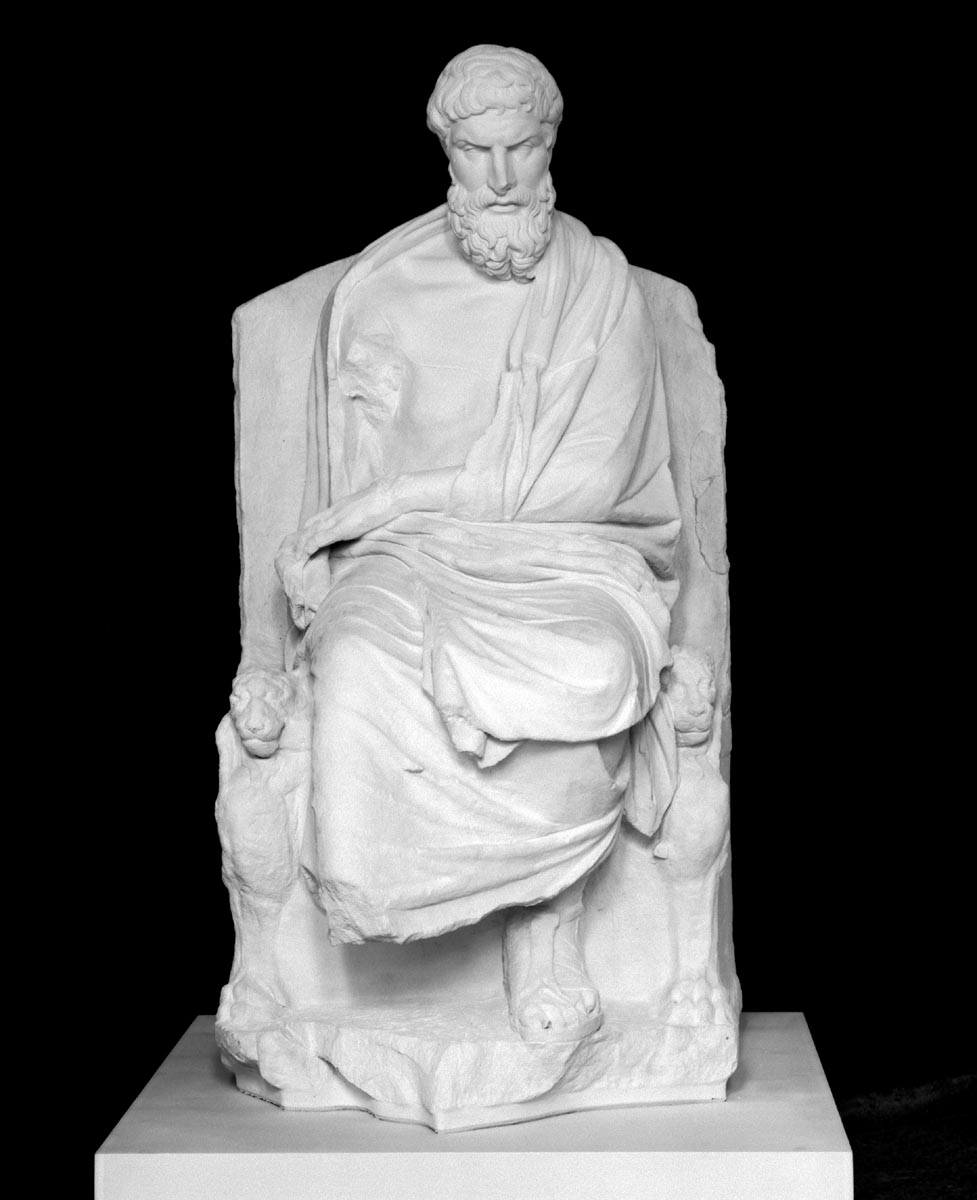
Reconstruction by K. Fittschen of an Epicurus enthroned statue, presumably set up after his death. University of Göttingen, Abgußsammlung

During the first generation, Epicurus and the other members of The Garden practiced a communal lifestyle, with the assets of all the members held in common, and no rigid hierarchy between teachers and students. They shared celebrations, festivals, banquets and funerals. Several rites that were celebrated at different times of the year: an annual funeral rite established by Epicurus in memory of his brothers and parents, two rites established for Epicurus himself; an annual one on his birthday (the 20th of Gamelion month) and one celebrated on the 20th of every other month in honor of both Epicurus and Metrodorus, another day dedicated to the memory of his brothers in the month of Poseidon, and another one for Polyaenus in the month of Metageitneon.

=== Death ===
Diogenes Laërtius records that, according to Epicurus's successor Hermarchus, Epicurus died a slow and painful death in 270 BC at the age of seventy-two from a stone blockage of his urinary tract. Despite being in immense pain, Epicurus is said to have remained cheerful and to have continued to teach until the very end. Possible insights into Epicurus's death may be offered by the extremely brief Epistle to Idomeneus, included by Diogenes Laërtius in Book X of his Lives and Opinions of Eminent Philosophers. The authenticity of this letter is uncertain; although the vast majority of scholars accept it as genuine along with ancient commentators like Cicero and Seneca.

I have written this letter to you on a happy day to me, which is also the last day of my life. For I have been attacked by a painful inability to urinate, and also dysentery, so violent that nothing can be added to the violence of my sufferings. But the cheerfulness of my mind, which comes from the recollection of all my philosophical contemplation, counterbalances all these afflictions. And I beg you to take care of the children of Metrodorus, in a manner worthy of the devotion shown by the young man to me, and to philosophy.

Interestingly, Cicero quotes this letter as having being received by Hermarchus, not Idomeneus, which indicates either that Cicero was wrong, Diogenes was wrong, or that the letter had multiple recipients. It was used by ancient commentators to support the idea that Epicurus was able to remain joyful to the end, even in the midst of his suffering. It also demonstrates that he maintained a special concern for the well-being of children.

== Philosophy ==
=== Physics ===
Epicurus believed in an eternal universe, where anything that comes into being must come from something that exists, all that is destroyed does not cease to exist, but all that exists always will. He held that this universe consists of two things; matter and void. Matter is made up of atoms, tiny bodies that are unable to be broken down into smaller parts, that only have the unchanging qualities of shape, size, and weight. There are an infinite number of these atoms, though only a finite number of types, and an infinite amount of void. Because of the infinite supply of atoms, there are an infinite number of worlds, each separated from each other by vast areas of void, some of which could be vastly different from our own.

The atoms are in constant motion through the void, moving in one of four different ways. They can collide with each other, either bouncing back, or joining together and vibrating to maintain the overall shape of the larger object. When not prevented by other atoms, all atoms naturally move at the same speed downwards in relation to the rest of the world, though they must also occasionally "swerve" randomly out of their usual path; without the swerving motion, atoms would never collide with each other from their parallel trajectory downwards. He also viewed weight as an inherent property of atoms which influences their movement. Epicurus argued that the swerve, which was absent in Democritus' earlier atomic theory, was also what accounted for humanity's free will; if it were not for the swerve, humans would be subject to a never-ending chain of cause and effect.

Epicurus also believed that senses relied on atoms; which were constantly being emitted from every object. Atoms themselves, which only had size, shape, and weight, did not possess the qualities perceived by the senses, such as redness, but instead would cause the observer to experience them in their mind. Because atoms moved sufficiently quickly, this would be experienced as a continuous sensation of vision.

=== Epistemology ===
Epicurus considered sense perception to be the foundation of knowledge. Although he had explained perception in terms of his atomic theory, he also designed his theory of knowledge to be independent of atomism, because he intended it to serve as justification for his philosophy of nature. Since Epicurus believed that sense perceptions were the basis of our knowledge, errors can only arise in how we judge those perceptions; although the senses sometimes receive contradictory information, they are the only means by which we receive information from the external world, and, recognizing the limits of our senses, it is necessary to use reason (dianoia) in order to organize the information we receive and determine whether our sense-organs are functioning correctly. However, reason still ultimately depends on the senses; Epicurus did not believe in the existence of abstract objects such as Plato's Theory of Forms that are derived entirely from thought.

==== Criteria of truth ====
In order to make judgements about the information we receive from our senses, Epicurus proposed three criteria of truth constituting the method through which we gain knowledge: sensations (aisthêsis), preconceptions (prolepsis), and feelings (pathê).

Sensations are the first and main criterion of truth for Epicureans; when judgments about things are formed, they can be verified or corrected through further closer examination, which eventually allows the observer to obtain "clear vision" (enargeia), a sensation of an object that is unchanged by further judgments or opinions and is a clear and direct perception of that object.

Preconceptions, Epicurus's second criterion of truth, are the concepts of what different things are that are formed in a person's mind through prior sense data. They are the background knowledge required for learning, allowing an observer to make judgments about perceived phenomena. When a word that relates to the preconception is used, these preconceptions are brought by the mind into the person's thoughts.

Epicurus's third criterion of truth are "choices and avoidances" which are the feelings of pleasure and pain that determine our actions. If something is pleasurable, we pursue it, and if something is painful, we avoid it. They are analogous to sensations in that they are a means of perception, but they perceive our internal state as opposed to external things.

==== Principle of Multiple Explanations ====
Epicurus applied his theory of knowledge to his understanding of nature; for understanding natural phenomena, we cannot rely on direct sense impressions alone, but must rely on inferences based on preconceptions. Hypotheses about phenomena that cannot be directly observed must be tested via relation to known observable facts, from which they are considered either contested or non-contested; a hypothesis that is not observable can be accepted as true if it is not contested by any explanations or observable phenomena.

However, a hypothesis can still be contested by other explanations without being directly contradicted by observable phenomena, so long as it is inconsistent with other potential explanations for how similar phenomena that can be closely observed are produced. For example, with the existence of atoms and void, Epicurus argues that there are no other possible explanations for the world we observe, so we must accept them as true. On the other hand, for various meteorological and cosmological phenomena, such as thunder and lightning or the waxing and waning of the moon and the motions of the stars, Epicurus produces several different possible explanations for the causes underlying the observed phenomena. Since none of the multiple explanations proposed can be verified or falsified, we must list them all and consider each of them to be possible, and cannot accept any of them as true.

Although Epicurus conceded that it may not be feasible to exhaustively list all possible causes, he believed it is still preferable to list several, rather than one, as becoming fixated on one possible explanation for all phenomena allows for the possibility of mythology and divine intervention as explanations, despite the fact that these have never been directly observed.

==== Epilogism ====
In addition to deductions based on the criteria of truth and inference of explanations based on observation, Epicurus also used a proof-free method of philosophical argumentation which he called Epilogism (ἐπίλογισμός), often translated as "appraisal" or "assessment," which was intended to provide insight via reflection when neither observation nor preconceptions about a given phenomenon could provide a consistent answer. For example, Epicurus claimed that although we do not have a preconception of time as an independent object, we nonetheless speak of having "a lot of time" or "little time" and we can arrive at a better understanding of how we conceive of time falling into discrete periods by reflecting on what we mean when we say "a lot of time." Epicurus also argued that we can arrive at insight on the relations between pleasure and pain, desire, and happiness through an assessment of our own sense experience, preconceptions and feelings beyond what we already know from them alone.

=== Ethics ===
Epicurus was a hedonist, meaning he taught that what is pleasurable is the only good and what is painful is the only evil. For his ethical system he redefined "pleasure" as the absence of suffering and taught that all humans should seek to attain the state of ataraxia, meaning "untroubledness", a state in which the person is completely free from all pain or suffering. This is contrast to other schools of Hellenistic philosophy such as Stoicism, Aristotelianism, and Platonism which considered virtue or virtuous activity the highest good. Epicurus took the view that the virtues, rather than being goods in of themselves, are instrumental and essential goods to live a pleasant life, arguing that all virtues stem from practical wisdom of how to live and that living virtuously went alongside living pleasantly.

Epicureans had a very specific understanding of what the greatest pleasure was, and the focus of their ethics was on the avoidance of pain rather than seeking out pleasure, arguing that pleasure reaches its limit in the removal of all sources of pain, in either mind or body. As evidence for this, Epicureans say that nature seems to command us to avoid pain, and they point out that all animals try to avoid pain as much as possible. Even though all pleasure is good and all pain is bad, however, does not mean all pain is to be shunned, nor all pleasure accepted, using a hedonistic calculus Epicurus argues, we sometime should accept pains for greater pleasures (avoiding more pain) and sometimes shun pleasures that cause pains.

Epicureanism divided pleasure into two broad categories: pleasures of the body and pleasures of the mind. Pleasures of the body involve sensations of the body, such as the act of eating delicious food or of being in a state of comfort free from pain, and exist only in the present. One can only experience pleasures of the body in the moment, meaning they only exist as a person is experiencing them. Pleasures of the mind involve mental processes and states; feelings of joy, the lack of fear, and pleasant memories are all examples of pleasures of the mind. Bodily pleasures, Epicurus argued, can only be affected by the present, whereas mental pleasures, can be affected by the past, present, and future at once, thus being more intense than those of the body. Because of this, the pleasures of the mind are considered to be greater than those of the body. Emphasis was placed on pleasures of the mind rather than on physical pleasures.

The Epicureans further divided each of these types of pleasures into two categories: kinetic pleasure and katastematic pleasure. Kinetic pleasure is the physical or mental pleasures that involve action or change. Eating delicious food, as well as fulfilling desires and removing pain, which is itself considered a pleasurable act, are all examples of kinetic pleasure in the physical sense. According to Epicurus, feelings of joy would be an example of mental kinetic pleasure. Katastematic pleasure is the pleasure one feels while in a state without pain. Like kinetic pleasures, katastematic pleasures can also be physical, such as the state of not being thirsty, or mental, such as freedom from a state of fear. While the pursuit of pleasure formed the focal point of the philosophy, this was largely directed to the "katastematic pleasures" of minimizing pain, anxiety and suffering. From this understanding, Epicureans concluded that the greatest pleasure a person could reach was the absence of pain, aponia, and lack of disturbance of mind, ataraxia, and, therefore, the ultimate goal then of Epicurean ethics was to reach a state of aponia and ataraxia.

=== Desires ===
In order to live pleasantly, an Epicurean thought they had to control their desires, because desire itself can often be painful. Not only will controlling one's desires bring about aponia, as one will rarely suffer from not being physically satisfied, but controlling one's desires will also help to bring about ataraxia because one will not be anxious about becoming discomforted since one has few desires, which are very easy to fulfill. The Epicureans divide desires into three classes: natural and necessary, natural but not necessary, and unnatural and unnecessary

- Natural and necessary: These desires are limited desires that are present in all humans; it is part of human nature to need them since we experience pain without them. They are necessary for one of three reasons: necessary for happiness, necessary for freedom from bodily discomfort, and necessary for life. Friendship and knowledge of natural science would belong to the first category, food, drink, clothes, medicine, and shelter belong to the second and third categories. These desires are the most important to fulfill.
- Natural but not necessary: These desires are those that do not contribute to any loss of pain and merely diversify pleasure. In other words they do not need to be fulfilled for happiness, freedom from bodily discomfort, or for life. Wanting to eat delicious food and drink, sex, and having a nice home are examples of natural but not necessary desires. They are considered fine to fulfill so long as they do not cause extreme stress due to difficulty in obtaining or keeping them, or are likely to cause harm and certainly not at the cost of our natural and necessary desires which can actually cause pain.
- Unnatural and unnecessary: These desires are ones that are counterintuitive of our nature to live well, that is they contribute more pain than pleasure. These are caused by the fact that they require extreme effort, and also in part because they are also limitless and so can never be fulfilled. Desires of wealth, power, or fame would fall in this class, and such desires are to be avoided. Natural but not necessary desires such as sex can become unnatural desires if they are pursued with great effort, causing stress, or are likely to cause harm, as this will cause more pain than pleasure.

If one follows only natural and necessary desires, then, according to Epicurus, one would be able to reach aponia and ataraxia and thereby the highest form of happiness. Unnecessary desires were to be treated cautiously so as to not cause stress or harm, and unnatural and unnecessary desires were to be suppressed.

=== Politics ===
Epicurus laid great emphasis on developing friendships, rather than political power or great wealth, as the basis of a satisfying life with mutual security and affection. While this avoidance or freedom could conceivably be achieved through political means, Epicurus insisted that involvement in politics would not release one from fear and he advised against a life of politics.

Epicurus and the Epicureans instead encouraged a formation of a community of friends outside the traditional political state. This community of virtuous friends would focus on internal affairs and justice. However, Epicureanism is adaptable to circumstance as is the Epicurean approach to politics. The same approaches will not always work in protection from pain and fear. In some situations it will be more beneficial to have a family and in other situations it will be more beneficial to participate in politics. It is ultimately up to the Epicurean to analyze their circumstance and take whatever action befits the situation.

Epicurus was also an early thinker to develop the notion of justice as a social contract, and in part attempts to address issues with the society described in Plato's Republic. The social contract theory established by Epicureanism is based on mutual agreement, not divine decree. He defined justice as an agreement made by people not to harm each other. The point of living in a society with laws and punishments is to be protected from harm so that one is free to pursue happiness. Because of this, laws that do not contribute to promoting human happiness are not just. He gave his own unique version of the ethic of reciprocity, which differs from other formulations by emphasizing minimizing harm and maximizing happiness for oneself and others. The Epicurean understanding of justice was inherently self-interested. Justice was deemed good because it was seen as mutually beneficial. Individuals would not act unjustly even if the act was initially unnoticed because of possibly being caught and punished. Both punishment and fear of punishment would cause a person disturbance and prevent them from being happy.

Epicurean ideas on politics disagree with other philosophical traditions, namely the Stoic, Platonist and Aristotelian traditions. To Epicureans all our social relations are a matter of how we perceive each other, of customs and traditions. No one is inherently of higher value or meant to dominate another. That is because there is no metaphysical basis for the superiority of one kind of person, all people are made of the same atomic material and are thus naturally equal. Epicureans also discourage political participation and other involvement in politics. However Epicureans are not apolitical; it is possible that some political association could be seen as beneficial by some Epicureans. Some political associations could lead to certain benefits to the individual that would help to maximize pleasure and avoid physical or mental distress.

The views of Epicurus and the Epicureans on marriage and having a family are a little more unclear. Epicurus himself seems to have been unmarried and did not have children, but Metrodorus (A close friend of Epicurus) was married and apparently had multiple children, one of whom was a son named after Epicurus, along with Epicurus himself making provisions in his will for the daughters of Metrodorus to be given in marriage when they come of age, which some see as evidence of Epicurus being more supportive of marriage and having children than previously thought. Lastly, there is also a translation issue in the "wise man sayings" from ancient biographer, Diogenes Laertius, in whether the Epicurean wise man will marry and have children, but only in accordance with circumstance, as supported by Cyril Bailey, or whether the wise man will not marry and have children except in certain circumstances as supported by Hicks.

=== Theology ===
Epicurus does not deny the existence of the gods; rather he denies their involvement in the world. According to Epicureanism, the gods do not interfere with human lives or the rest of the universe in any way – thus, it shuns the idea that frightening weather events are divine retribution. One of the fears the Epicurean ought to be freed from is fear relating to the actions of the gods.

The manner in which the Epicurean gods exist is still disputed. Some scholars say that Epicureanism believes that the gods exist outside the mind as material objects (the realist position), while others assert that the gods only exist in our minds as ideals (the idealist position). The realist position holds that Epicureans understand the gods as existing as physical and immortal beings made of atoms that reside somewhere in reality. However, the gods are completely separate from the rest of reality; they are uninterested in it, play no role in it, and remain completely undisturbed by it. Instead, the gods live in what is called the metakosmia, or the space between worlds. Contrarily, the idealist (sometimes called the "non-realist position" to avoid confusion) position holds that the gods are just idealized forms of the best human life, and it is thought that the gods were emblematic of the life one should aspire towards. While a scholarly consensus has yet to be reached, the realist position remains the prevailing viewpoint at this time.

==== Epicurean paradox ====
The Epicurean paradox is a version of the problem of evil. Lactantius attributes this trilemma to Epicurus in De Ira Dei, 13, 20-21:

God, he says, either wishes to take away evils, and is unable; or He is able, and is unwilling; or He is neither willing nor able, or He is both willing and able. If He is willing and is unable, He is feeble, which is not in accordance with the character of God; if He is able and unwilling, He is envious, which is equally at variance with God; if He is neither willing nor able, He is both envious and feeble, and therefore not God; if He is both willing and able, which alone is suitable to God, from what source then are evils? Or why does He not remove them?

Although no extant writings of Epicurus contain this argument, it is possible that some form of this argument may have been found in his lost treatise On the Gods. However, since Epicurus did believe in the existence of gods, if he really did make some form of this argument, it would have been an argument against divine providence, the idea that the gods interfere in the world.

=== Death ===
Epicurus rejected immortality. Epicureans believe in the soul, but Epicureanism suggests that the soul is mortal and material, just like the body. Epicurus rejected any possibility of an afterlife and contended that it is precisely for this reason that one need not fear death: "Death is nothing to us; for that which is dissolved, is without sensation, and that which lacks sensation is nothing to us." A related saying of Epicurus on death is: "Death, therefore, the most awful of evils, is nothing to us, seeing that, when we are, death is not come, and, when death is come, we are not." From this doctrine arose the Epicurean Epitaph: Non fui, fui, non sum, non curo ("I was not; I have been; I am not; I do not mind."), which is inscribed on the gravestones of his followers and seen on many ancient gravestones of the Roman Empire.

== Works ==
Epicurus was an extremely prolific writer who wrote around 300 treatises on a variety of subjects. Known titles of works of Epicurus include:

1. On Nature, in 37 books
2. Doctrine of the Twelve Elements,
3. On Atoms and the Void
4. On the Angle of the Atom
5. Against the Megarians
6. Against Democritus
7. Against Theophrastus
8. Canon, or On the Criterion
9. On Sensory Presentation
10. On the Sensation of Touch
11. On Vision
12. On Images
13. Prognostication
14. Exhortation to Study Philosophy
15. Principal Doctrines
16. Problems
17. On the End-Goal
18. On Lifecourses, in four books
19. On Choices and Avoidances
20. Theories of the Passions, against Timocrates
21. On Love
22. On Justice and Other Virtues
23. Symposium
24. On Gifts and Gratitude
25. On Fair Dealing
26. On Kingship
27. On Music
28. On Wealth
29. On Rhetoric
30. On the Gods
31. On Holiness
32. On Destiny
33. Theories about Diseases and Death, Dedicated to Mithres
34. Neocles, addressed to Themista
35. Eurylochus, addressed to Metrodorus
36. Chaeridemus
37. Hegesianax
38. Aristobulus
39. Polymedes
40. Timocrates, in three books
41. Metrodorus, in five books
42. Antidorus, in two books
43. Callistolas
44. Anaximenes
45. Letters

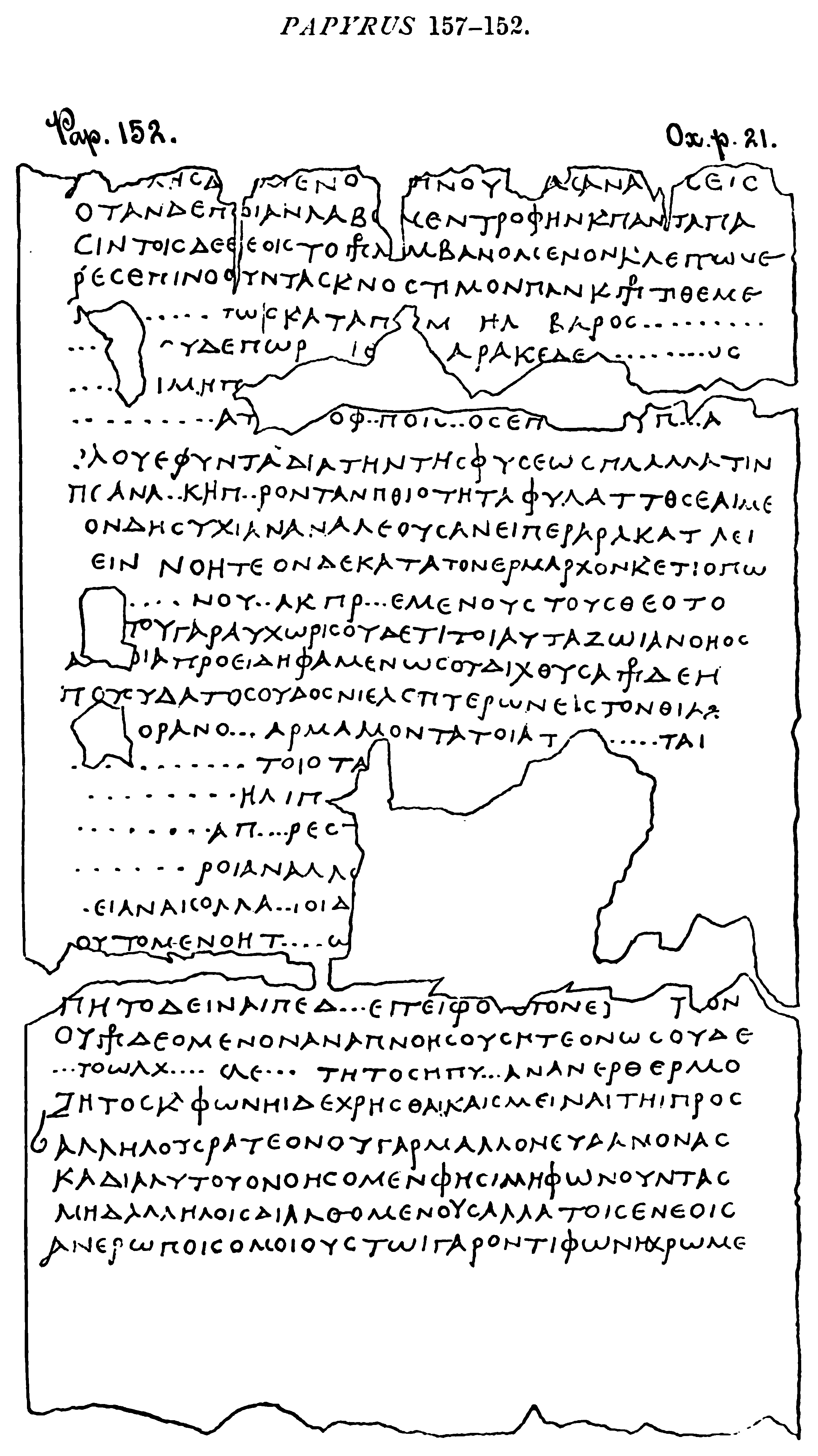
An illustration of an unrolled papyrus recovered from the Epicurean Villa of the Papyri in Herculaneum

Although more original writings of Epicurus have survived to the present day than of any other Hellenistic Greek philosopher, the vast majority of everything he wrote has still been lost. The only surviving complete works by Epicurus are the Principal Doctrines (Κύριαι Δόξαι) and a few letters which summarize Epicurean doctrines. Numerous fragments of Epicurus's lost thirty-seven volume treatise On Nature have also been found among the charred papyrus fragments at the Villa of the Papyri at Herculaneum.

=== On Nature ===
On Nature (Ancient Greek: Περὶ φύσεως) is Epicurus's main philosophical work, a treatise in 37 books. The work is not preserved intact, however, many parts have been discovered among the Herculaneum papyri, a collection of papyrus scrolls carbonized by the eruption of Mount Vesuvius in 79 AD, which were discovered at an Epicurean villa in Herculaneum:

- Book 2 discusses the existence, formation, and motion of simulacra, the objects of perception.
- Book 11 discusses cosmology, the shape and stability of the earth, and an argument against the use of astronomical instruments.
- Book 14 criticizes the theory of Classical elements in the Timaeus of Plato, along with the doctrines of the pre-Socratic pluralist philosophers.
- Book 15, which is very fragmentary, discusses atoms and compounds, along with a critique of Anaxagoras theory of Homoeomeria
- Book 25 discusses moral responsibility and perfection, and argues from these premises for the existence of free will and self-determination from a physicalist perspective.
- Book 28 contains a record of a discussion between Epicurus and Metrodorus, among other members of the Garden, focused on the use of philosophical terminology to convey concepts accurately, and whether or not a philosopher can verify the truth of statements made using ordinary language without risking inaccuracy or ambiguity.
- Book 34 discusses fear that arises from superstition, and the problem of mental perception.
- Another book, whose number has not been preserved, discusses the Epicurean theory of time.

=== Canon ===
Canon (Ancient Greek: Κανών lit. Rule) was Epicurus's principal work on epistemology, the theory of knowledge, which was intended to serve as a justification for his philosophy of nature.

Although this work has not survived, a brief summary of its contents has been preserved by Diogenes Laertius, which can be compared with other testimonies of Epicurus's epistemology in order to reconstruct an outline of its contents. The title, which was likely taken from a similar work, Canons, written by Democritus, is a reference to a mason's rule, the straightedge instrument used as a standard to determine the straightness of beams and walls, which was a metaphor for the criteria of truth set out in the work, which were intended to be used as a standard to assess the truth of other beliefs.

=== Principal Doctrines ===
The Principal Doctrines are forty authoritative conclusions set up as official doctrines by Epicurus. Some of the Principal Doctrines are organized into groups and are meant to be studied together. The first four doctrines make up the Tetrapharmakos (Four Cures). Doctrines 5-21 and 26-30 discuss other topics in ethics, 22-25 deal with epistemology, and 31-40 explain the Epicurean doctrines on justice and societal relations.

==== Tetrapharmakos ====
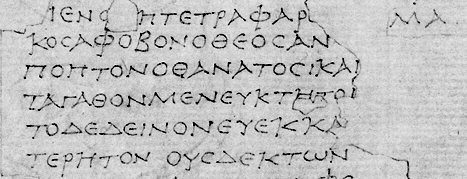
Part of Herculaneum Papyrus 1005 (P.Herc.1005), col. 5. Contains Epicurean tetrapharmakos from Philodemus' Adversus Sophistas.

Tetrapharmakos (τετραφάρμακος), or "The four-part cure", is a basic guideline as to how to live the happiest possible life, based on the first four of the doctrines. These are short recommendations to avoid anxiety or existential dread. The name "tetrapharmakon" comes from a compound of four drugs (wax, tallow, pitch and resin); used metaphorically by Roman-era Epicureans to refer to the four remedies for healing the soul.

Each saying is meant to be a short reminder of Epicurean cures for the major fears that Epicurean philosophy sought to cure, teaching that the gods do not intervene in the world as that conflicts with a true conception of the Gods as perfect beings, that death is nothing to us since death will never cause us any pain while alive, that happiness is easy to attain with nature requiring very little for a happy life, and that pain is either severe but short or long but very manageable and thus easy to endure and disregard.

Don't fear god,
Don't worry about death;
What is good is easy to get, and
What is terrible is easy to endure.

— Philodemus, Herculaneum Papyrus, 1005, 4.9–14

=== Letters of Epicurus ===
A collection of at least 24 of Epicurus's letters organized by date circulated in antiquity, referred to by Philodemus, the majority of which are lost. Three letters of Epicurus are preserved by Diogenes Laertius in his Life of Epicurus: in the Letter to Herodotus and the Letter to Pythocles, Epicurus summarizes his philosophy on nature and, in the Letter to Menoeceus, he summarizes his moral teachings. Another letter is preserved by Diogenes of Oenoanda, the Letter to Mother, which discusses overcoming fears with an understanding of natural science as a means of attaining happiness.

==== Letter to Herodotus ====
Epicurus's Letter to Herodotus was written as an introduction to Epicurean philosophy and method of studying nature. It is divided into three parts: the first deals with physical principles, the second deals with compound structures that are formed from the motions of atoms within the void, and the third deals with the purposes for studying nature.

==== Letter to Pythocles ====
Epicurus's Letter to Pythocles deals with meteorological and astronomical phenomena, arguing that the knowledge of learning such things has no purpose other than the attainment of ataraxia. After discussing methodology, Epicurus moves on to cosmology, including the stars and the movement of the sun and moon, and then weather patterns, concluding with other astronomical topics. Epicurus's authorship of this letter has occasionally been contested.

==== Letter to Menoeceus ====
Epicurus's Letter to Menoeceus is a summary of his ethical teachings. It addresses theology, the hierarchies of desires, how to weigh choices and avoidances in order to achieve net pleasure and self-sufficiency, and then concludes with a discussion of phronesis and the Epicurean sage in terms of the tetrapharmakos.

==== Letter to Mother ====
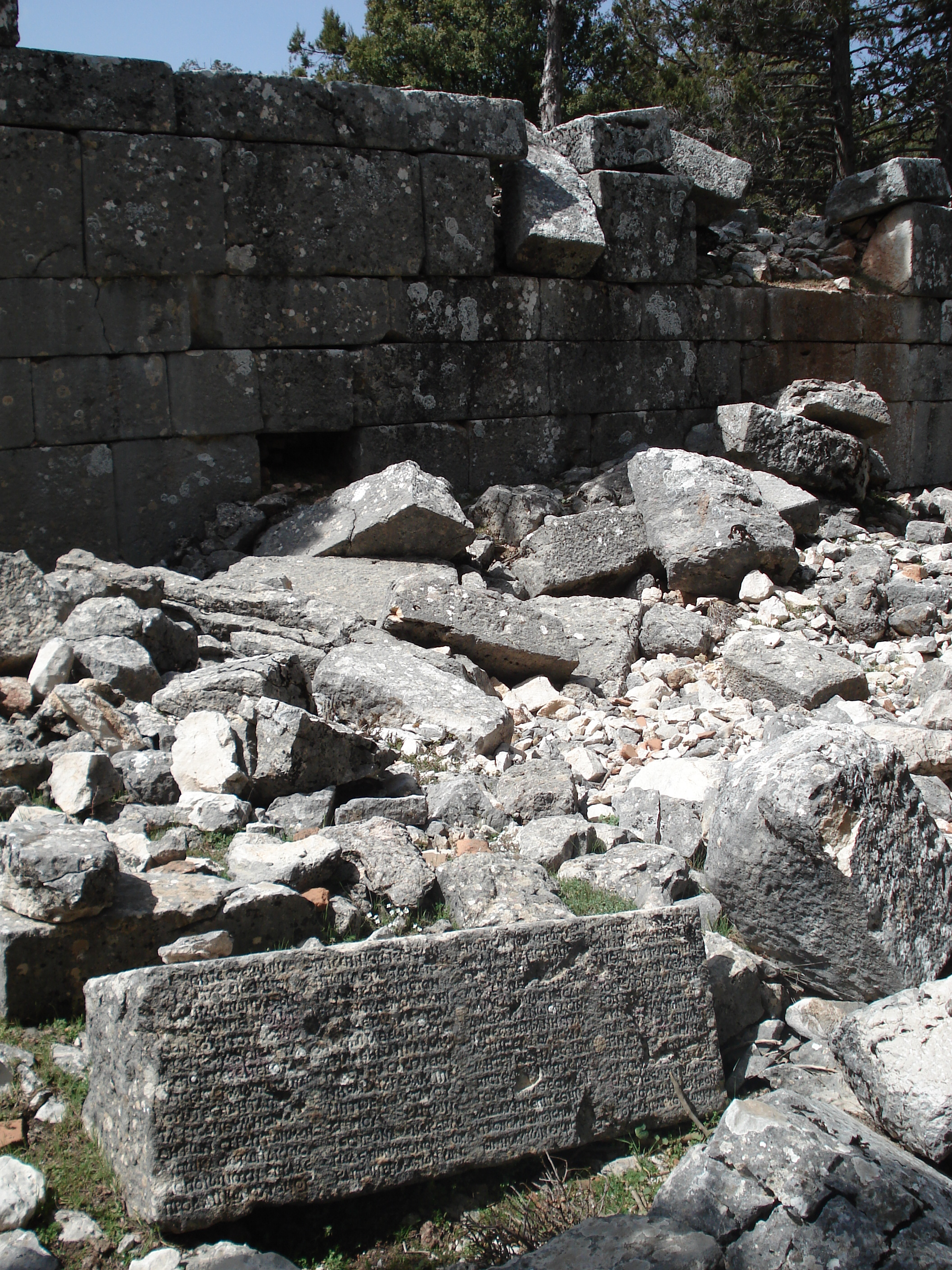
Epicurus's Letter to Mother was inscribed onto the portico walls of the 2nd century Epicurean philosopher Diogenes' residence in Oenoanda, Lycia, in modern day Turkey, along with numerous other Epicurean letters and treatises.

Epicurus's Letter to Mother is a letter addressed to Epicurus's mother, reassuring her that the disturbing dreams that she had about him do not reflect reality and asking her to stop sending him supplies and money rather than saving it for herself, as he is already well supported by his friends. As a means of combating her superstitions about dreams, he describes the mechanics of dreams from a scientific perspective, comparing a vision in a dream to the process of how images formed in the mind from ordinary sight. Epicurus then discusses incremental progress towards happiness, and how doing so allows a philosopher to emulate the gods, not by becoming immortal, but by experiencing what it feels like to be a god during one's mortal life, by attaining the long-term stability associated with ataraxia.

The majority of scholars attribute this letter to Epicurus himself, on the basis of a comparison with doctrines in other fragments of his writing, other independent characterizations of his mother as a superstitious person, and a linguistic analysis of the use of accurate terminology from his own time period. However, it has also been suggested that the letter was written by Diogenes of Oenoanda, who preserved the letter, or that the letter is part of a lost epistolary novel written by a later author, such as the collection of letters attributed to the Platonist philosopher Chion of Heraclea.

=== Vatican Sayings ===
In 1888, another collection of eighty-one Epicurean sayings was discovered in a manuscript in the Vatican Library, now commonly referred to as the Vatican Sayings, which repeats many of the Principal Doctrines and likely preserves the views of Epicurus and some of his immediate followers.

== Legacy ==
=== Ancient Epicureanism ===
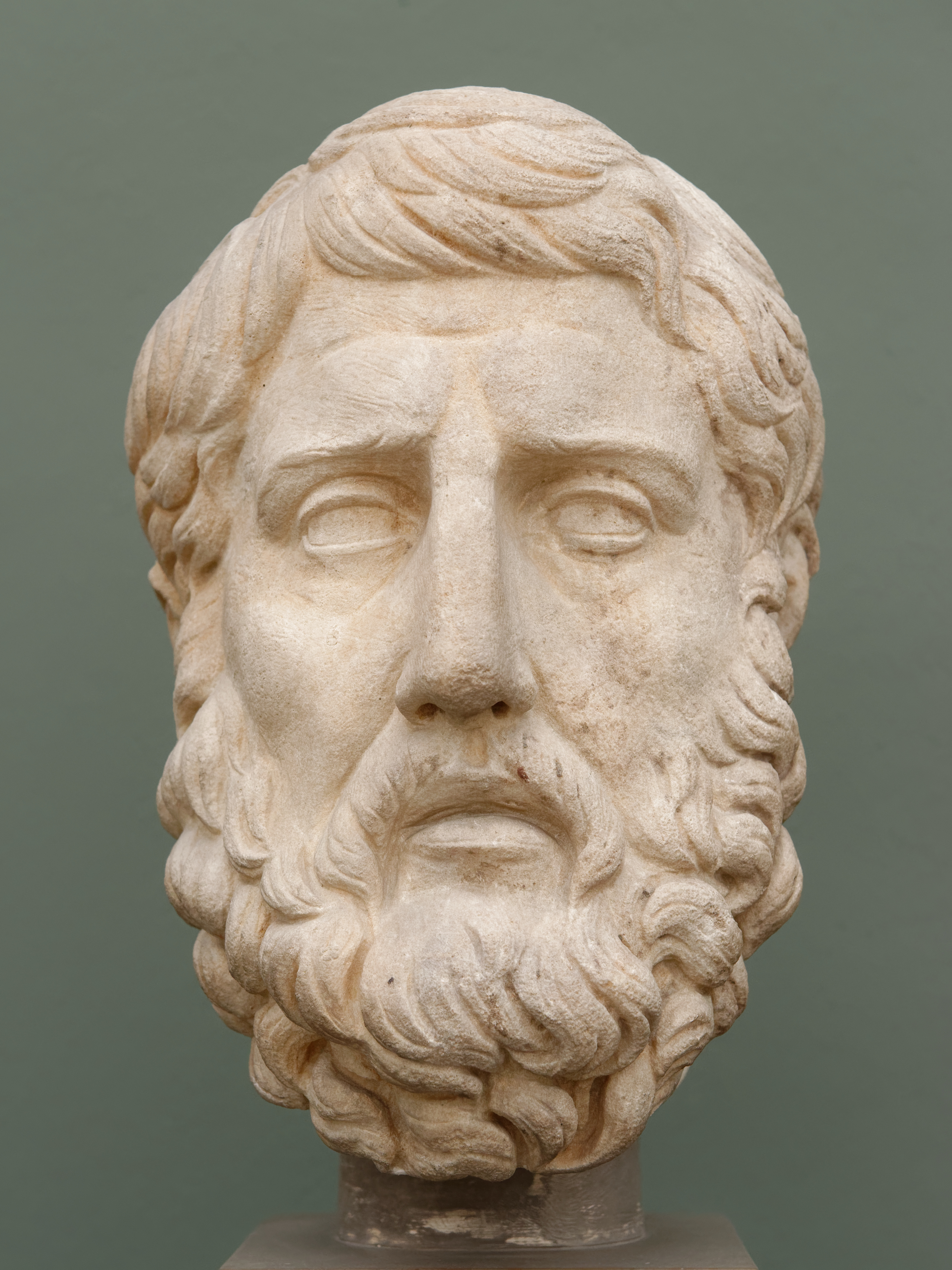
Bust of Hermarchus, Roman copy of a 3rd century BC original. Hermarchus was the scholarch of the Garden after Epicurus's death in 270 BC

After Epicurus's death, his follower Hermarchus had succeeded him as the scholarch of the Garden in Athens. Hermarchus' successor, Polystratus (died c. 220 BC), probably never knew Epicurus himself; one work by him survives criticizing philosophers who have contempt for public opinion. The next two heads of the school were Dionysius of Lamptrai (died c. 200), about whom little is known, and Basilides (died c. 175). Epicurus's doctrines seem to have become rather popular in Asia Minor in the 2nd century BC; before becoming head of the school in Athens, Basilides appears to have originally studied under an Epicurean community in Syria, where he collaborated with the mathematicians Apollonius of Perga and Hypsicles, and taught Philonides of Laodicea, a mathematician and Epicurean philosopher who was a member of the Seleucid court of Antiochus IV Epiphanes and Demetrius I Soter.

There were also several divisions within the school early on; even in Epicurus's lifetime, Timocrates of Lampsacus, the brother of his closest disciple Metrodorus, had left the school and published several tracts critical of Epicureanism. During the 2nd and 1st centuries BC, dissident sects of Epicureans established themselves in Cos and Rhodes who broke with the scholarchs of the Garden. While these Epicureans still considered the works of Epicurus and his closest followers to be authoritative, disputes arose about the interpretation of the works; determining which works were genuine, textual criticism of corrupt or contradictory passages, and clarification of difficult passages, which occasionally seemed to present errors.

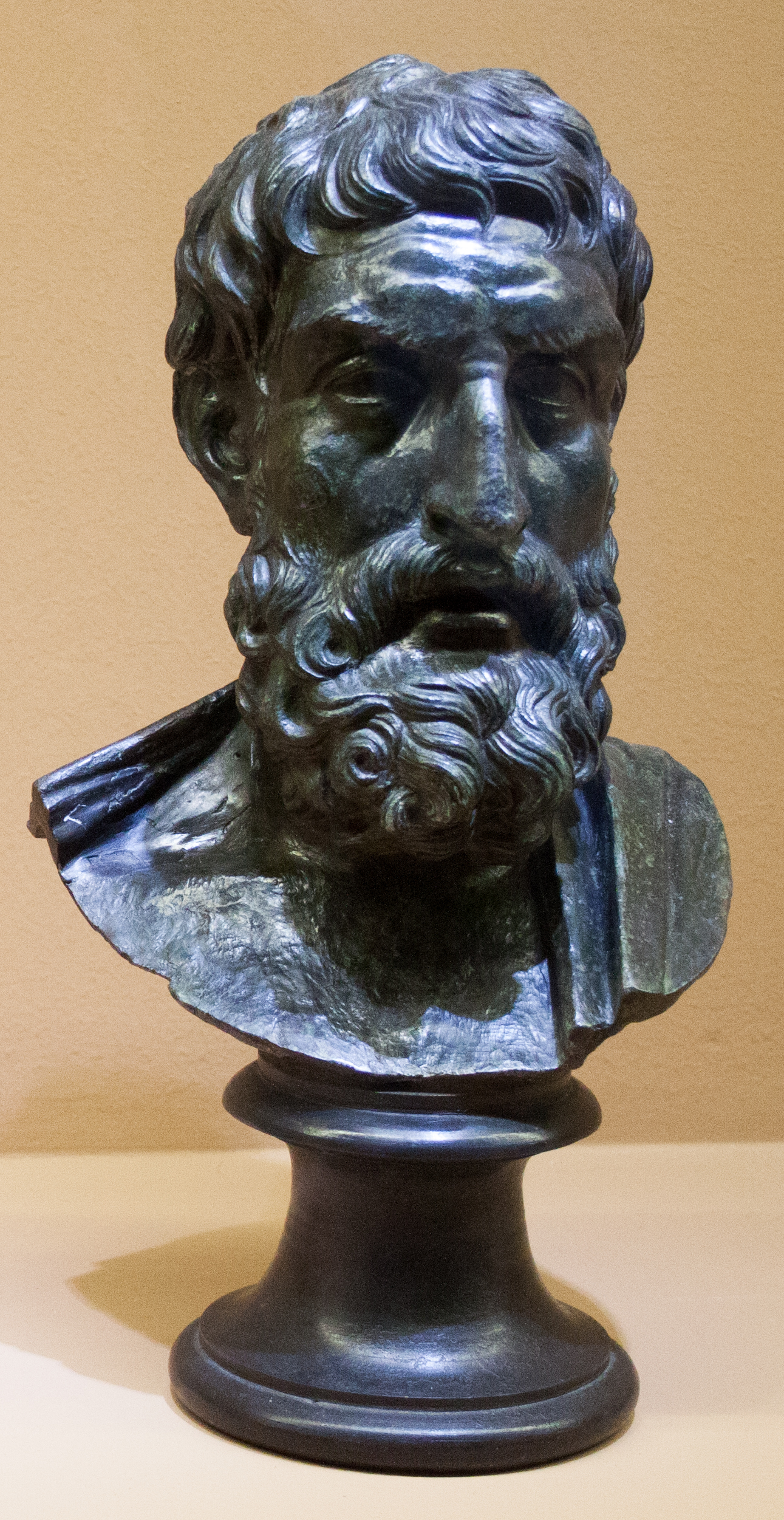
Bronze bust of Epicurus recovered from the Villa of the Papyri in Herculaneum, which contains a library of Epicurean works collected by Philodemus.

After Basilides, there is a gap in the historical record; the next known head of the Garden in Athens was Apollodorus, nicknamed "the tyrant of the Garden" who served as head from roughly the middle of the second century BC until 110 BC; though he apparently wrote over 400 books, only traces of a life of Epicurus and a few other works survive. Another Epicurean writing at the same time whose works are more thoroughly preserved is Demetrius Lacon (c. 150-75 BCE), who taught at an Epicurean school in Miletus. Demetrius wrote works not only on traditional Epicurean subjects such as cosmology, theology, and ethics, but also mathematics, poetry, and rhetoric, testifying to the expanding interests of the school, as well as philological works defending the orthodox readings and interpretations of the works of Epicurus. He was followed in this approach by Zeno of Sidon (c. 150-75 BCE), who took over as the next head of the Athenian school. Both Zeno and Demetrius seem to have been in communication with important figures in Rome, and Zeno's most prominent pupil, Philodemus, left to establish a school there. During Zeno's tenure, Athens' role in the First Mithridatic War (88-86 BC), and Sulla's subsequent reconquest of the city in 86 BC, plunged all of the philosophical schools in Athens into crisis; after Zeno's death, the next two heads of the Garden, Phaedrus (died c. 70 BC) and Patro (died after c. 51 BC), both returned to Athens from Rome, where they had fled during the war, to head the school, and the middle of the 1st century BCE last evidence for the Athenian Garden's existence.

In Rome, the first Epicureans to attempt to spread their doctrines there, Alcaeus and Philiscus, had been expelled from the city in 155 BC, while the earliest Epicurean writers in Latin, Amafinius, Catius, and Rabirus, mostly drew the ire of Cicero for their ethical shortcomings and poor prose. However, three Epicurean philosophers in the 1st century BC, Philodemus, Lucretius, and Siro, did much to establish Epicurus's reputation in Italy, being later defended by Roman consul Lucius Manlius Torquatus and Gaius Velleius in the works of Cicero, even as Epicureanism began to decline in Athens. Philodemus, a student of Zeno of Sidon, attracted a wealthy patron, Calpurnius Piso the father-in-law of Julius Caesar, and founded a school that was intended to be a continuation of the Epicurean Garden in Athens, circulating the works of his predecessors and writing treatises on the whole scope of Epicurean philosophy, many of which have been found at the Villa of the Papyri. Lucretius, a poet who seems to have read Epicurus's works outside the Epicurean school tradition, wrote De rerum natura, a long didactic poem in Latin dactylic hexameter verse, which is still extant, that explained Epicurus's natural philosophy to a Roman audience, covering roughly the first 15 books of Epicurus's On Nature. Meanwhile, Siro established another school in Italy where he instructed a circle of Roman poets in Epicureanism, which included Virgil.

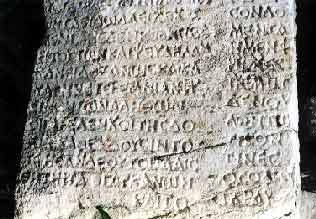
Diogenes of Oenoanda, an Epicurean philosopher living in Lycia, in the early 2nd century AD, inscribed roughly 260 square meters of Epicurean writings onto the portico walls of his own residence, which were rediscovered in the 1880s.

In the first and second centuries AD, Epicureanism gradually began to decline as it failed to compete with Stoicism, which had an ethical system more in line with traditional Roman values. Prominent critics of his philosophy include prominent authors such as the Roman Stoic Seneca the Younger (c. 4 BC – AD 65) and the Greek Middle Platonist Plutarch (c. 46 – c. 120). Some time in the 2nd century CE, an otherwise an unknown Epicurean philosopher, Diogenes of Oenoanda, attempted to preserve the doctrines of his school in an enormous wall inscription in Lycia that originally spanned 260 square meters and contained several treatises totalling over 25000 words of writing, roughly a third of which has been preserved.

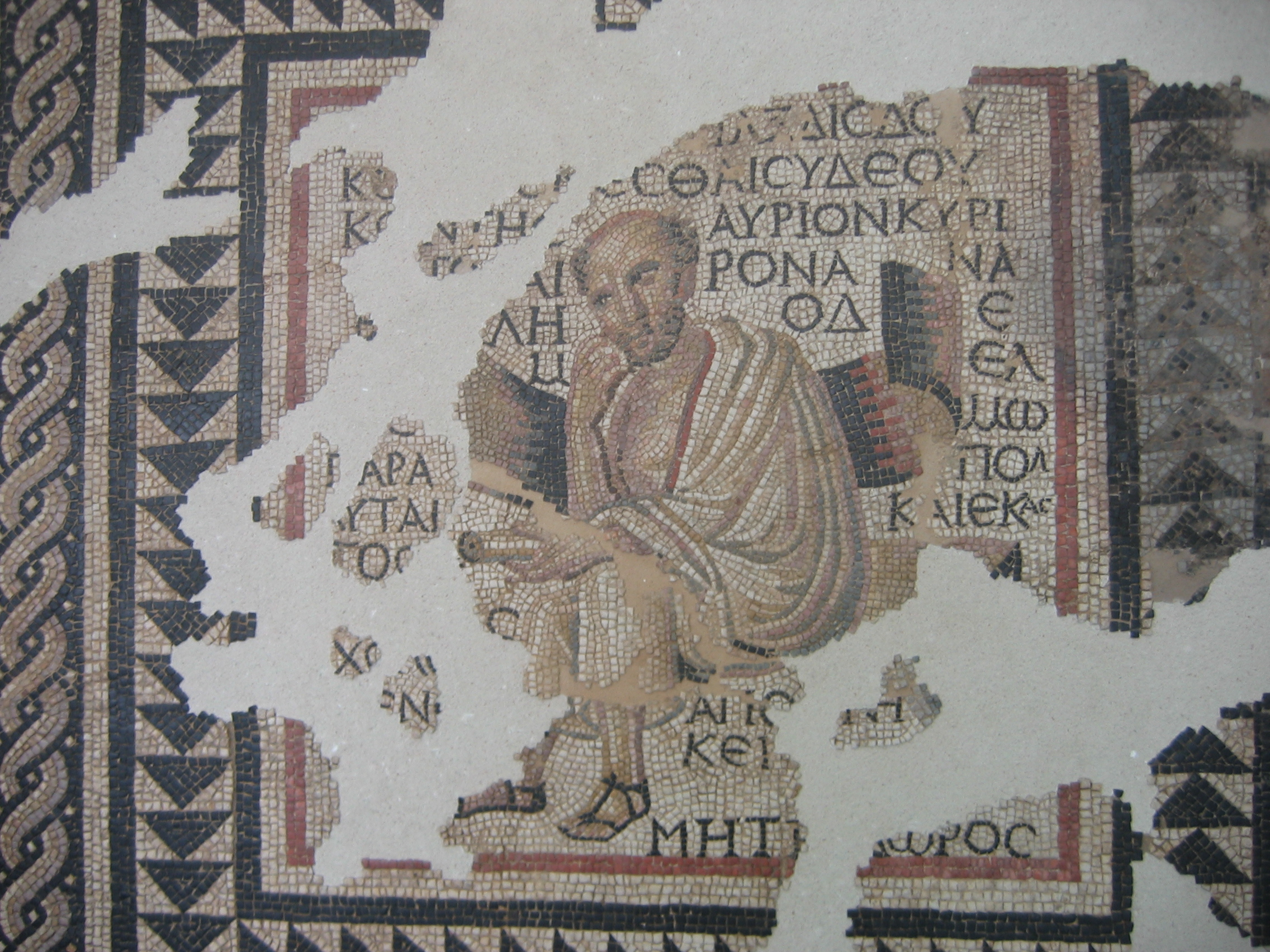
Mosaic from a Roman villa, from the late 2nd or early 3rd century AD, depicting the Epicurean philosopher Metrodorus of Lampsacus

During the third century AD, Christianity rapidly expanded throughout the Roman Empire. Of all the Greek philosophical schools, Epicureanism was the one most at odds with the new Christian teachings, since Epicureans believed that the soul was mortal, denied the existence of an afterlife, denied that the divine had any active role in human life, and advocated pleasure as the foremost goal of human existence. As such, Christian writers such as Justin Martyr (c. 100–c. 165 AD), Athenagoras of Athens (c. 133–c. 190), Tertullian (c. 155–c. 240), and Clement of Alexandria (c. 150–c. 215), Arnobius (died c. 330), and Lactantius (c. 250-c.325) all singled it out for the most vitriolic criticism.

By the early fifth century AD, Epicureanism was virtually extinct. The Christian Church Father Augustine of Hippo (354–430 AD) declared, "its ashes are so cold that not a single spark can be struck from them."

=== Middle Ages ===
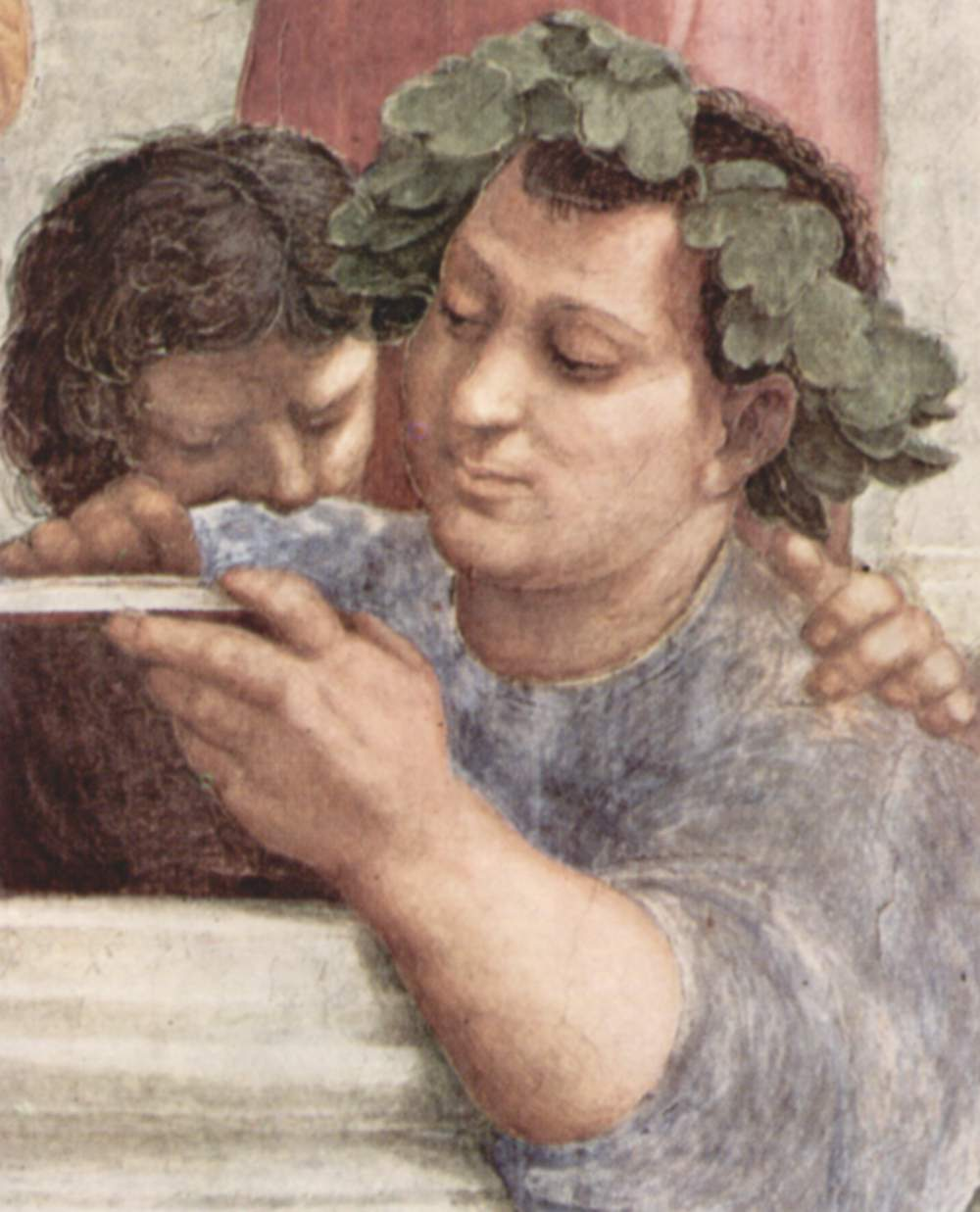
Epicurus in Raphael's School of Athens (1509–1511). In the Middle ages, Epicurus was depicted in popular culture as a vain pleasure-seeker.

While Plato and Aristotle enjoyed a privileged place in Christian philosophy throughout the Middle Ages, Epicurus, whose ideas could less easily be adapted to suit a Christian worldview, was not held in such esteem. Information about Epicurus's teachings was available, through Lucretius's On the Nature of Things, quotations of it found in medieval Latin grammars and florilegia and encyclopedias, such as Isidore of Seville's Etymologiae (seventh century) and Hrabanus Maurus's De universo (ninth century), but there is little evidence that these teachings were systematically studied or comprehended.

During the Middle Ages, Epicurus frequently appeared in popular culture as a gatekeeper to the Garden of Delights, the "proprietor of the kitchen, the tavern, and the brothel." He appears in this guise in Martianus Capella's Marriage of Mercury and Philology (fifth century), John of Salisbury's Policraticus (1159), John Gower's Mirour de l'Omme, and Geoffrey Chaucer's Canterbury Tales. Epicurus and his followers also appear in Dante Alighieri's Inferno in the Sixth Circle of Hell, where they are imprisoned in flaming coffins for having believed that the soul dies with the body.

In Medieval Jewish philosophy, several philosophers discussed Epicurean doctrines. Although the first apparent reference to Epicurus in Rabbinic literature appears much earlier, the term epikoros, cited in the Mishnah, meaning "a heretic," earlier uses of the term do not show any knowledge of specific Epicurean doctrines. However, in the 10th through 12th centuries, Abraham ibn Ezra, Abraham ibn Daud, and Judah Halevi reference specific Epicurean doctrines, such as the treatment of pleasure as the only good and the eternity of the world, which they were likely introduced to via Arabic translations of the works of the Aristotelian commentator Alexander of Aphrodisias. A much fuller discussion of Epicurean doctrines, however, is given by Maimonides in The Guide to the Perplexed, where he compares Epicurean atomism to the atomistic doctrines of Saadia Gaon and other philosophers of the Jewish Kalam school, which Maimonides believed were ultimately derived from Epicurus, and may derive from earlier encounters between Rabbinic Judaism and Epicurean literature during Late antiquity.

=== Renaissance ===
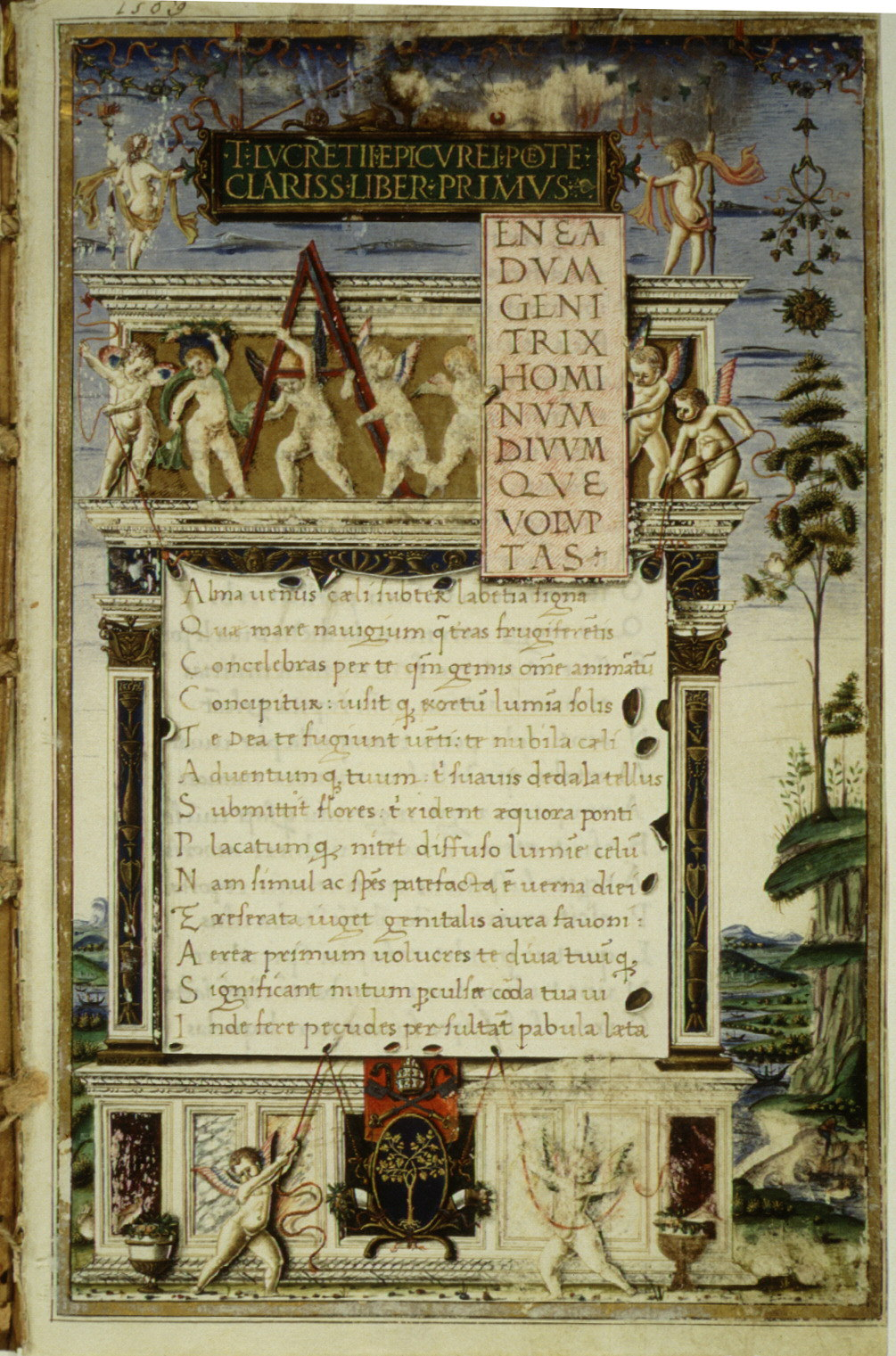
De rerum natura manuscript, c. 1483. The rediscovery of this ancient Epicurean work in 1417 by Poggio Bracciolini provided Renaissance humanists with a thorough account of Epicurus's teachings

In 1417, Poggio Bracciolini discovered a copy of Lucretius's On the Nature of Things in a monastery near Lake Constance, which contained a comprehensive account of Epicurus's teachings. The first scholarly dissertation on Epicurus, De voluptate (On Pleasure) by the Italian Humanist and Catholic priest Lorenzo Valla was published in 1431. In the treatise, Valla presented a discussion on the nature of the highest good between an Epicurean, a Stoic, and a Christian. Although Valla's dialogue ultimately rejects Epicureanism, by presenting an Epicurean as a member of the dispute, Valla lent Epicureanism credibility as a philosophy that deserved to be taken seriously. Francesco Zabarella (1360–1417), Francesco Filelfo (1398–1481), Cristoforo Landino (1424–1498), and Leonardo Bruni (c. 1370–1444) also gave Epicureanism a fairer analysis than it had traditionally received.

Nonetheless, "Epicureanism" remained a pejorative, synonymous with extreme egoistic pleasure-seeking, rather than a name of a philosophical school. Even liberal religious skeptics who might have been expected to take an interest in Epicureanism evidently did not; Étienne Dolet (1509–1546) only mentions Epicurus once in all his writings and François Rabelais (between 1483 and 1494–1553) never mentions him at all. Although Michel de Montaigne (1533–1592) quoted 450 lines of Lucretius's On the Nature of Things in his Essays, his interest in Lucretius, however, seems to have been primarily literary and he is ambiguous about his feelings on Lucretius's Epicurean worldview.

=== Revival ===
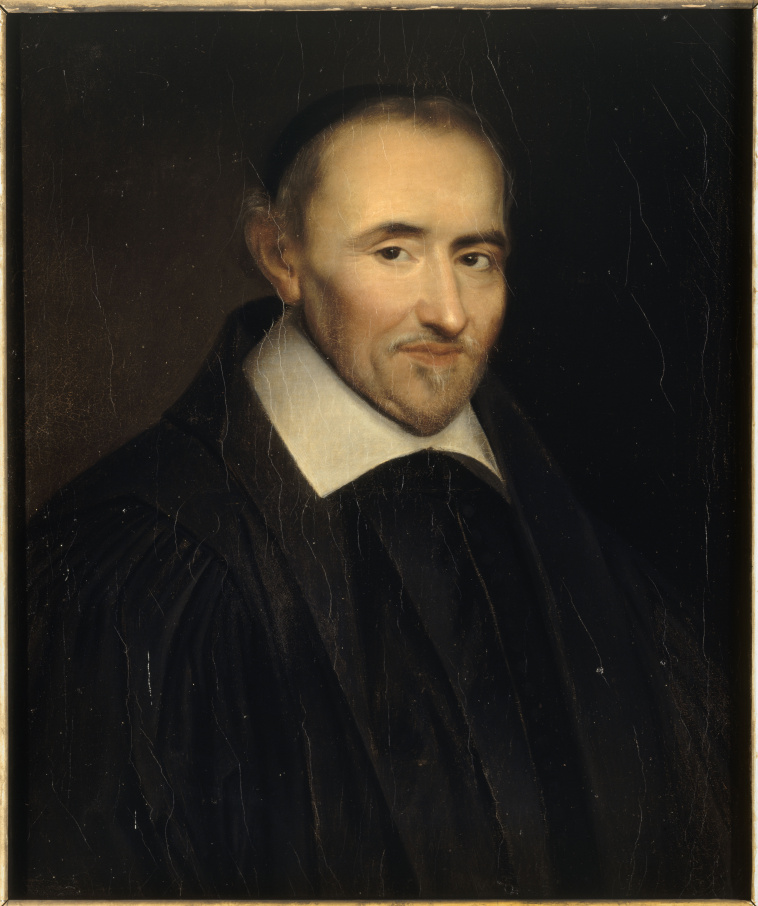
The French priest and philosopher Pierre Gassendi is responsible for reviving Epicureanism in modernity as an alternative to Aristotelianism.

The French Catholic priest and scholar Pierre Gassendi (1592–1655) published several books expounding Epicureanism that exerted a profound influence on later writings about Epicurus. However, he modified some of Epicurus's doctrines in order to make them more palatable for a Christian audience; for example, by stating that atoms were not eternal, uncreated, and infinite in number, instead contending that an extremely large but finite number of atoms were created by God at creation. Gassendi's version of Epicurus's teachings became popular among some members of English scientific circles, who treated Epicurean atomism as a starting point for their own idiosyncratic theories. To orthodox thinkers, however, Epicureanism was still regarded as immoral and heretical until Walter Charleton (1619–1707) provided the English public with readily available descriptions of Epicurus's philosophy and assured orthodox Christians that Epicureanism was no threat to their beliefs. The Royal Society, chartered in 1662, advanced Epicurean atomism; one of its most prolific defenders of atomism was the chemist Robert Boyle (1627–1691). John Locke (1632–1704) also adapted Gassendi's modified version of Epicurus's epistemology, which became highly influential on English empiricism.

Epicureanism was also beginning to lose its associations with indiscriminate and insatiable gluttony, which had been characteristic of its reputation ever since antiquity. Instead, the word "epicure" began to refer to a person with extremely refined taste in food, for example, "such an epicure was Potiphar—to please his tooth and pamper his flesh with delicacies" from William Whately's Prototypes (1646).

Around the same time, the Epicurean injunction to "live in obscurity" was beginning to gain popularity as well. In 1685, Sir William Temple (1628–1699) abandoned a promising career as a diplomat and instead retired to his garden, devoting himself to writing essays on Epicurus's moral teachings. That same year, John Dryden translated the celebrated lines from Book II of Lucretius's On the Nature of Things: "'Tis pleasant, safely to behold from shore / The rowling ship, and hear the Tempest roar."

=== Modern ===
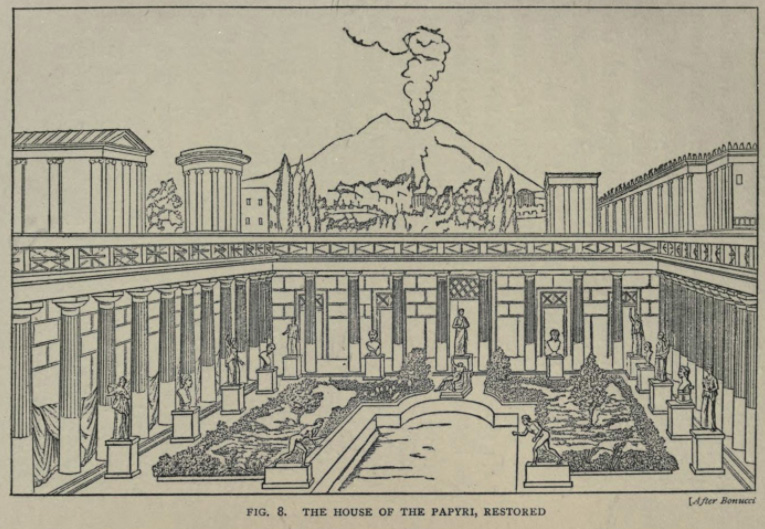
Imagined reconstruction of the Epicurean Villa of the Papyri, which was rediscovered in Herculaneum in the 18th century. The Herculaneum Papyri, which were carbonized by the eruption of Mount Vesuvius in 79 AD, contain numerous Epicurean treatises.

In 19th century Britain, Jeremy Bentham, John Stuart Mill, and Henry Sidgwick adapted Epicurus's psychological hedonism to their own ethical theories of Utilitarianism, which sought to maximize overall happiness. Although Epicurus himself, unlike the Utilitarians, did not promote the idea of pursuing happiness as a general ethical goal, these philosophers drew on Epicurus explanations of happiness (Eudaimonia) in terms of the relations between pleasures and pains for insight into their own ethical theories.

In his doctoral thesis, The Difference Between the Democritean and Epicurean Philosophy of Nature, Karl Marx (1818–1883) interpreted Democritus as a rationalist skeptic, whose epistemology was inherently contradictory, but saw Epicurus as a dogmatic empiricist, whose worldview is internally consistent and practically applicable.

The British poet Alfred Tennyson (1809–1892) praised "the sober majesties / of settled, sweet, Epicurean life" in his 1868 poem "Lucretius". Epicurus's ethical teachings also had an indirect impact on the philosophy of Utilitarianism in England during the nineteenth century.

Friedrich Nietzsche once noted: "Even today many educated people think that the victory of Christianity over Greek philosophy is a proof of the superior truth of the former – although in this case it was only the coarser and more violent that conquered the more spiritual and delicate. So far as superior truth is concerned, it is enough to observe that the awakening sciences have allied themselves point by point with the philosophy of Epicurus, but point by point rejected Christianity."

Academic interest in Epicurus and other Hellenistic philosophers increased over the course of the late twentieth and early twenty-first centuries, with an unprecedented number of monographs, articles, abstracts, and conference papers being published on the subject. The texts from the library of Philodemus of Gadara in the Villa of the Papyri in Herculaneum, first discovered between 1750 and 1765, are being deciphered, translated, and published by scholars part of the Philodemus Translation Project, funded by the United States National Endowment for the Humanities, and part of the Centro per lo Studio dei Papiri Ercolanesi in Naples. Epicurus's popular appeal among non-scholars is difficult to gauge, but it seems to be relatively comparable to the appeal of more traditionally popular ancient Greek philosophical subjects such as Stoicism, Aristotle, and Plato.

== Bibliography ==
=== Primary source texts ===
==== Philodemus ====
- On Frank Criticism. (1998), David Konstan, Diskin Clay, Clarence, E. Glad. SBL. ISBN 1-58983-292-2
- On Music (PHerc. 1497)
- On Piety, Part 1. (1996). Critical Text with Commentary by Dirk Obbink. Oxford University Press. ISBN 0-19-815008-3
- On Property Management. (2013), Voula Tsouna. SBL. ISBN 1-58983-667-7
- On Rhetoric Books 1 and 2: Translation and Exegetical Essays. (2005). Clive Chandler (editor). Routledge. ISBN 0-415-97611-1
- On Epicurus (PHerc. 1232, 1289)
- On the Way of Life of the Gods (PHerc. 152, 157)

==== Lucretius ====
- Lucretius Carus, Titus (1976). On the nature of the universe. Translated by Latham, R. E. London: Penguin Books. ISBN 978-0-14-044018-8.

==== Aetius ====
- Mansfeld, Jaap; Runia, David T. (2023). Aetius: Placita. Cambridge, Mass. London: Harvard University Press. ISBN 978-0-674-99759-2.

==== Plutarch ====
- Babbitt, Frank Cole (1957). Moralia, in fifteen volumes, with an English translation by Frank Cole Babbitt. Vol. 14. Cambridge Harvard University Press; London : Heinemann.

==== Lucian of Samosata ====
- Peter Thonemann, ed. (2021). Lucian: Alexander Or the False Prophet. Translated by Peter Thonemann. Oxford University Press. ISBN 978-0-19-886824-8.

==== Diogenes of Oenoanda ====
- Diogenes of Oinoanda (1993). The Epicurean inscription. Translated by Smith, Martin Ferguson. Napoli: Bibliopolis. ISBN 978-88-7088-270-4.

==== Sextus Empiricus ====
- Bury, Robert Gregg (1971) [1st Pub. 1949]. Sextus Empiricus: Against the professors (reprint). W. Heinemann. ISBN 978-0-434-99273-7. OCLC 929410533.

==== Diogenes Laërtius ====
- Laërtius, Diogenes. "Epicurus" . Lives of the Eminent Philosophers. Vol. 2:10. Translated by Hicks, Robert Drew (Two volume ed.). Loeb Classical Library.
- Laërtius, Diogenes (1969). Caponigri, A. Robert (ed.). Lives of the Philosophers. Chicago: Henry Regnery Co.

==== Lactantius ====
- "De ira Dei". The Works of Lactantius. T. & T. Clark. 1871.

==== Epicurea ====
The Epicurea is a collection of texts, fragments, and testimonies by Epicurus that was collected by Hermann Usener in 1887. This work features a collection of writings by Epicurus that explain the values and beliefs of Ancient Epicurian philosophy.

- Epicurus (2010). Usener, Hermann (ed.). Epicurea. doi:10.1017/CBO9780511711077. ISBN 9780511711077.
- "Epicurus: Fragments - translation". www.attalus.org. Translated by Anderson, Erik. 2006.

==== Modern compilations ====
- Bailey, Cyril (1926). Epicurus The Extant Remains. Oxford University Press.
- Long, A. A.; Sedley, D. N. (9 April 1987). The Hellenistic Philosophers: Volume 1, Translations of the Principal Sources with Philosophical Commentary. Cambridge University Press. ISBN 978-1-139-64289-7.
- Epicurus (1994). Inwood, Brad; Gerson, Lloyd P. (eds.). The Epicurus Reader. Selected Writings and Testimonia. Indianapolis: Hackett. ISBN 978-0-87220-242-9.

=== Sources ===
- Asmis, Elizabeth (2009). "Epicurean empiricism". In Warren, James (ed.). The Cambridge Companion to Epicureanism. Cambridge University Press.
- Barnes, Jonathan (1986), "15: Hellenistic Philosophy and Science", in Boardman, John; Griffin, Jasper; Murray, Oswyn (eds.), The Oxford History of the Classical World, Oxford, England: Oxford University Press, pp. 365–385, ISBN 978-0198721123
- Brown, Eric (2009). "Politics and society". In Warren, James (ed.). The Cambridge Companion to Epicureanism. New York: Cambridge University Press. pp. 179–196. ISBN 978-05218-7347-5.
- Clay, Diskin (1998). Paradosis and survival: three chapters in the history of Epicurean philosophy. University of Michigan Press. ISBN 978-0-472-10896-1.
- DeWitt, Norman Wentworth (1976) [1954], Epicurus and His Philosophy, Minneapolis, Minnesota: University of Minnesota Press, ISBN 978-0-816-65745-2
- Danzig, Gabriel (2020). "Epicurus and the Epicureanism in Rabbinic Literature". In Mitsis, Phillip (ed.). The Oxford handbook of Epicurus and epicureanism. Oxford: Oxford university press. pp. 549–581. ISBN 9780199744213.
- Dorandi, Tiziano (2020). "Epicurus and the Epicurean School". In Mitsis, Phillip (ed.). The Oxford handbook of Epicurus and epicureanism. Oxford: Oxford university press. pp. 13–42. ISBN 9780199744213.
- Erler, Michael (2011), "Chapter II: Autodidact and student: on the relationship of authority and autonomy in Epicurus and the Epicurean tradition", in Fish, Jeffrey; Sanders, Kirk R. (eds.), Epicurus and the Epicurean Tradition, Cambridge, England: Cambridge University Press, pp. 9–28, ISBN 978-0-521-19478-5
- Gordon, Pamela (2012), The Invention and Gendering of Epicurus, Ann Arbor, Michigan: The University of Michigan Press, ISBN 978-0-472-02817-7
- Gordon, Pamela (1996). Epicurus in Lycia. The Second-Century World of Diogenes of Oenoanda. Ann Arbor: Univ. of Michigan Press. ISBN 978-0-472-10461-1.
- Gordon, Pamela (2020). "Diogenes of Oenoanda". In Mitsis, Phillip (ed.). The Oxford handbook of Epicurus and epicureanism. Oxford: Oxford university press. pp. 531–548. ISBN 9780199744213.
- Jones, Howard (2010), "Epicurus and Epicureanism", in Grafton, Anthony; Most, Glenn W.; Settis, Salvatore (eds.), The Classical Tradition, Cambridge, Massachusetts and London, England: The Belknap Press of Harvard University Press, pp. 320–324, ISBN 978-0-674-03572-0
- Hickson, Michael W. (2014), "A Brief History of Problems of Evil", in McBrayer, Justin P.; Howard-Snyder, Daniel (eds.), The Blackwell Companion to The Problem of Evil, Hoboken, New Jersey: Wiley-Blackwell, pp. 26–27, ISBN 978-1-118-60797-8
- Konstan, David (2011). "Epicurus on the gods". In Fish, Jeffrey; Sanders, Kirk R. (eds.). Epicurus and the Epicurean Tradition. United Kingdom: Cambridge University Press. ISBN 9780521194785.
- Konstan, David. "Epicurus". In Zalta, Edward N. (ed.). Stanford Encyclopedia of Philosophy. ISSN 1095-5054. OCLC 429049174.
- Long, A. A. (2020). "Epicureanism and Utilitarianism". In Mitsis, Phillip (ed.). The Oxford handbook of Epicurus and epicureanism. Oxford: Oxford university press. pp. 742–760. ISBN 9780199744213.
- O'Keefe, Tim (2010). Epicureanism. University of California Press.
- Schafer, Paul M. (2003), "The Young Marx on Epicurus: Dialectical Atomism and Human Freedom", in Gordon, Dane L.; Suits, David B. (eds.), Epicurus: His Continuing Influence and Contemporary Relevance, Rochester, New York: Rochester Institute of Technology, Cary Graphic Arts Press, pp. 127–138, ISBN 978-0-9713-4596-6
- Sedley, David (2011). "Epicurus' theological innatism". In Fish, Jeffrey; Sanders, Kirk R. (eds.). Epicurus and the Epicurean Tradition. United Kingdom: Cambridge University Press. ISBN 9780521194785.
- Sharples, R. W. (1996). Stoics, Epicureans, and Sceptics: An introduction to Hellenistic Philosophy. New York, NY: Routledge.
- Striker, Gisela (2020). "Epistemology". In Mitsis, Phillip (ed.). The Oxford handbook of Epicurus and epicureanism. Oxford: Oxford university press. pp. 43–58. ISBN 9780199744213.
- Taub, Liba (2009). "Cosmology and meterology". In Warren, James (ed.). The Cambridge Companion to Epicureanism. New York: Cambridge University Press. pp. 105–124. ISBN 978-05218-7347-5.
- Tsouna, Voula (2020). "Hedonism". In Mitsis, Phillip (ed.). The Oxford handbook of Epicurus and epicureanism. Oxford: Oxford university press. pp. 141–188. ISBN 9780199744213.
- Wilson, Catherine (2015). Epicureanism: a very short introduction. Oxford, United Kingdom: Oxford University Press. ISBN 9780199688326. OCLC 917374685.
