= Nikidion =

Ancient Greek hetaira

Nikidion ("Little Victory") (floruit circa 300 BCE) was a hetaira (courtesan) who was a female student of Epicurus. She served as a character in Martha Nussbaum's philosophical works.

== In literature ==
Martha Nussbaum, in her book The Therapy of Desire, adopts Nikidion for her (notional) female protagonist exploring the schools of Hellenistic philosophy. Nussbaum described its original possessor as "perhaps historical and probably fictitious." Nussbaum also uses the character of Nikidion in her article Skepticism about Practical Reason in Literature And the Law Commentary which criticizes the judicial skepticism of Oliver Wendell Holmes Jr. and Robert Bork.

Nikidion provided Nussbaum with a feminist vehicle wherewith to explore the ancient Greek philosophies of life from the practical standpoint of a young enquirer. Nussbaum urged us to consider Nikidion "as she really might have been: smart but ill-educated, relatively weak in intellectual discipline, fonder of poetry than of Plato...attached to her wardrobe, her wines, and even her religion". The protagonist is envisaged as starting anew (like a somewhat repetitive Candide) in various schools of thought, including those of Aristotle, Epicureanism, Stoicism, and Pyrrhonism; and thus as moving onwards through time, and from Greece to Rome. Nikidion is seen for example exploring her experience of grief with Chrysippus, and the links between love and anger with Seneca the Younger.

Bernard Williams criticized that Nikidion proves for Nussbaum "a slightly creaky device".

== See also ==
- Leontion
- Orlando
- Rasselas

== Sources ==
- Nussbaum, Martha Craven (1994). The therapy of desire: theory and practice in Hellenistic ethics. Princeton Univ. Press. ISBN 978-0-691-03342-6. OCLC 231622330.
