= Leonteus of Lampsacus =

Leonteus of Lampsacus (Greek: Λεοντεύς) was a pupil of Epicurus early in the 3rd century BCE. He was the husband of Themista, who also attended Epicurus' school. Such was the esteem in which they held Epicurus that they named their son after him.

Leonteus is described by Strabo, as one of "the ablest men in the city" of Lampsacus, along with Idomeneus. Plutarch describes a letter, written by Leonteus, in which Leonteus describes how Democritus was honoured by Epicurus "for having anticipated him in getting hold of correct knowledge," and how Epicurus originally proclaimed himself a "Democritean."
