= Metrodorus of Lampsacus (the younger) =

3rd-century BC Greek Epicurean philosopher

Metrodorus
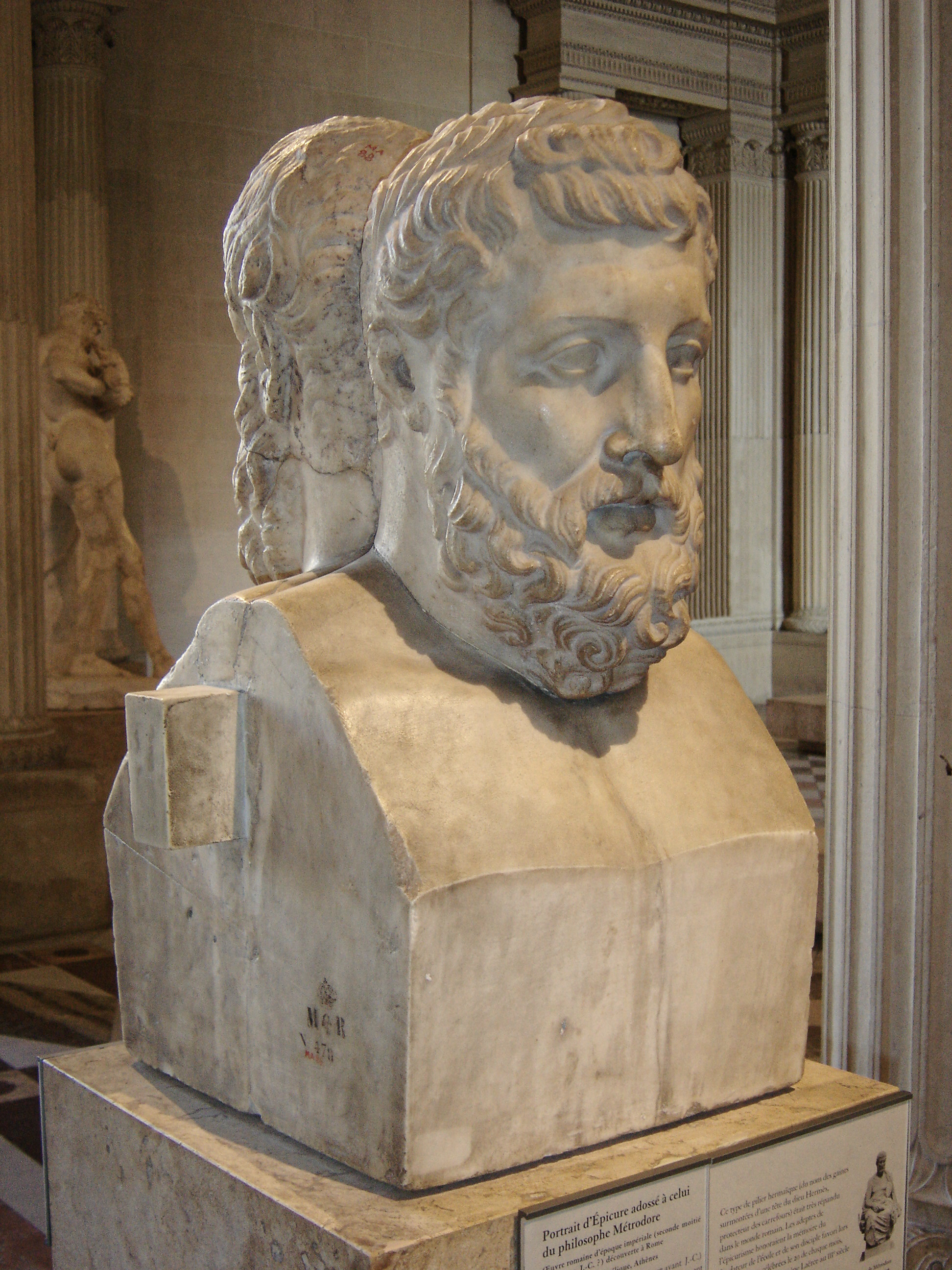
- Herm-type bust of Metrodorus leaned with his back against Epicurus, in the Louvre
- Born: 331/0 BC; Lampsacus (now Lapseki, Çanakkale, Turkey)
- Died: 278/7 BC

Philosophical work
- Era: Hellenistic philosophy
- Region: Western philosophy
- School: Epicureanism
- Main interests: Ethics, Physics

Metrodorus of Lampsacus (Greek: Μητρόδωρος Λαμψακηνός, Mētrodōros Lampsakēnos; 331/0–278/7 BC) was a Greek philosopher of the Epicurean school. Although one of the four major proponents of Epicureanism, only fragments of his works remain. A Metrodorus bust was found in Velia, slightly different modeled to depict Parmenides.

== Life ==
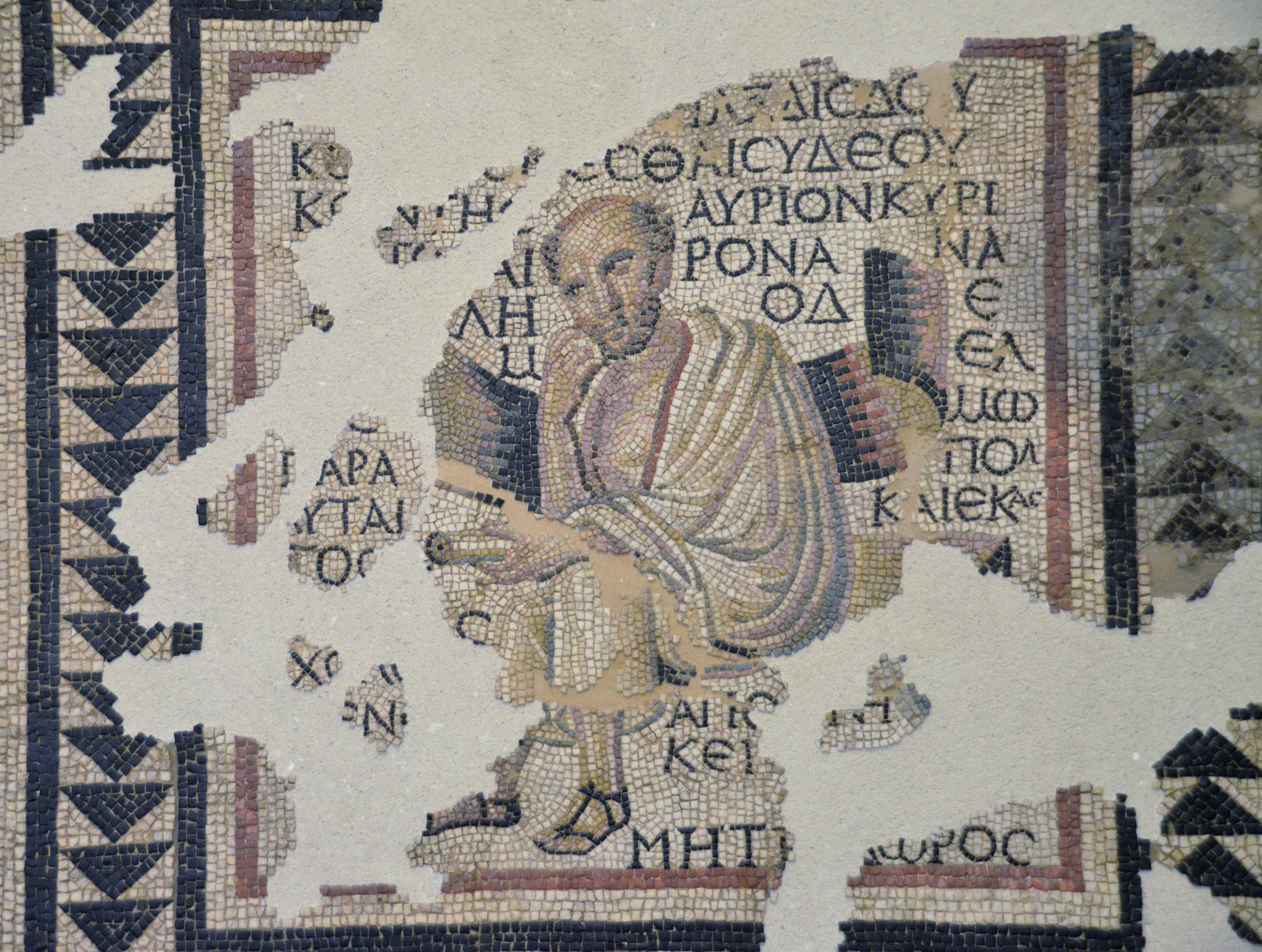
A Roman mosaic depicting Metrodorus, from Autun, France, late 2nd or early 3rd century AD, Musée Rolin

Metrodorus was a native of Lampsacus on the Hellespont. His father's name was Athenaeus or Timocrates, his mother's Sande. Together with his brother Timocrates of Lampsacus he joined the school Epicurus had set up in their home town. Timocrates, however, soon fell out with both his brother and Epicurus and devoted the rest of his life to spreading malicious slander about them. Metrodorus on the other hand soon became the most distinguished of the disciples of Epicurus, with whom he lived on terms of the closest friendship, and whom he later followed to Athens, never having left him since he became acquainted with him, except for six months on one occasion, when he paid a visit to his home.

Metrodorus died in 278/7 BC, aged 53, seven years before Epicurus, who would have appointed him his successor had he survived him. He left behind him a son named Epicurus, and a daughter, whom Epicurus, in his will, entrusted to the guardianship of Amynomachus and Timocrates of Potamus, to be brought up under the joint care of themselves and Hermarchus, and provided for out of the property which he left behind him. In a letter also which he wrote upon his death-bed, Epicurus commended the children to the care of Idomeneus, who had married Batis, the sister of Metrodorus. The 20th of each month was kept by the disciples of Epicurus as a festive day in honour of their master and Metrodorus. Leontion is spoken of as the wife or mistress of Metrodorus.

Diogenes Laërtius mentioned Epicurus's letter, "All my books to be given to Hermarchus. And if anything should happen to Hermarchus before the children of Metrodorus grow up, Amynomachus and Timocrates shall give from the funds bequeathed by me, so far as possible, enough for their several needs, as long as they are well ordered. And let them provide for the rest according to my arrangements; that everything may be carried out, so far as it lies in their power. Of my slaves I manumit Mys, Nicias, Lycon, and I also give Phaedrium her liberty."

== Philosophy ==
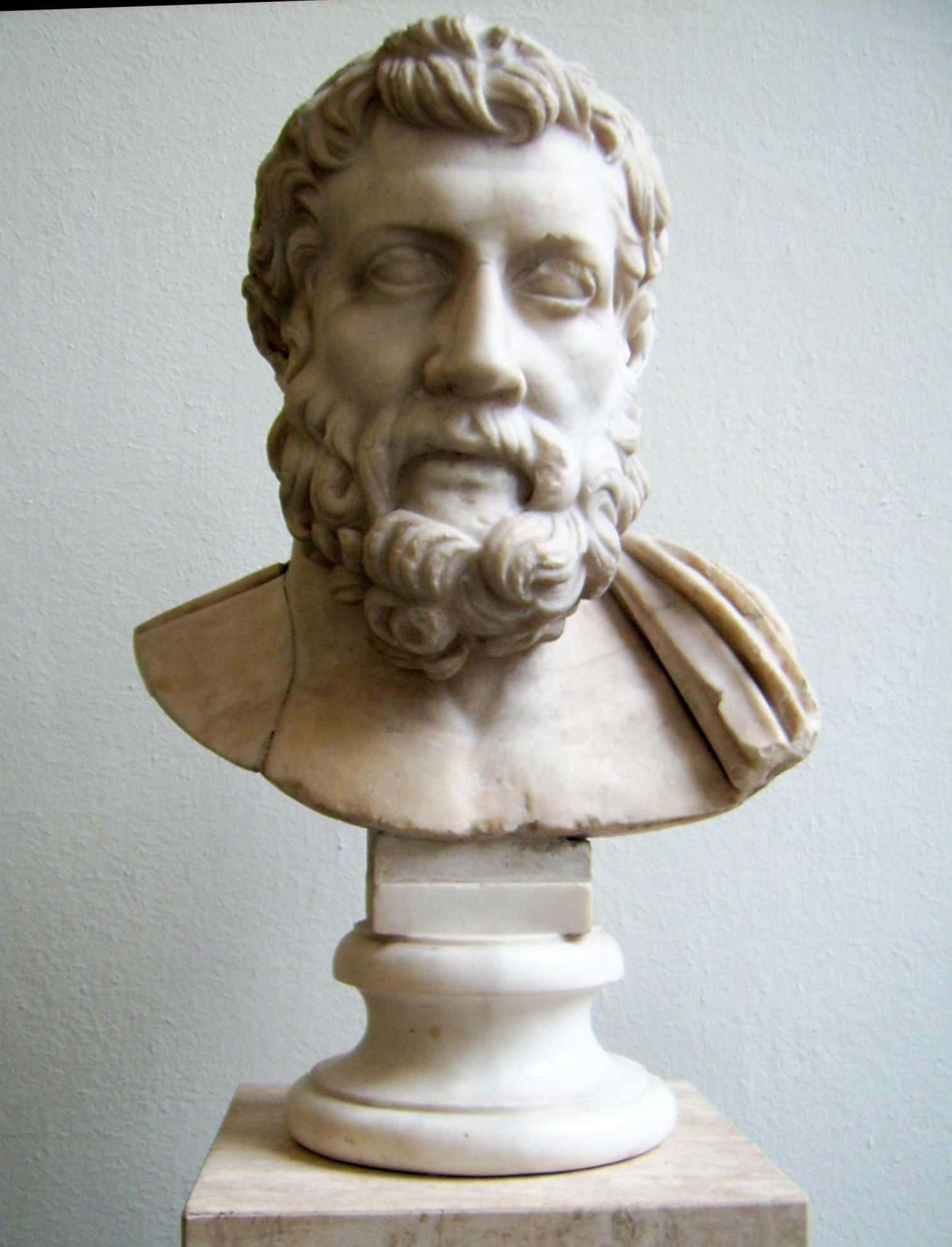
Roman copy of a Greek portrait bust of Metrodorus. (Pergamon museum, Berlin)

The philosophy of Metrodorus appears to have been of a more sensual kind than that of Epicurus. Perfect happiness, according to Cicero's account, he made to consist in having a well-constituted body, and knowing that it would always remain so. He found fault with his brother for not admitting that the belly was the test and measure of every thing that pertained to a happy life. According to Seneca, Epicurus placed Metrodorus among those who previously required assistance from others to find their way towards the truth, compared with others who could find the truth on their own without any assistance (Epicurus considering himself in this category).

Diogenes Laërtius lists the following works by Metrodorus:

- Πρὸς τοὺς ἰατρούς, τρία – Against the Physicians (3 volumes)
- Περὶ αἰσθήσεων – On Sensations
- Πρὸς Τιμοκράτην – Against Timocrates
- Περὶ μεγαλοψυχίας – On Magnanimity
- Περὶ τῆς Ἐπικούρου ἀρρωστίας – On Epicurus's Weak Health
- Πρὸς τοὺς διαλεκτικούς – Against the Dialecticians
- Πρὸς τοὺς σοφιστάς, ἐννέα – Against the Sophists (9 volumes)
- Περὶ τῆς ἐπὶ σοφίαν πορείας – On the Way to Wisdom
- Περὶ τῆς μεταβολῆς – On Change
- Περὶ πλούτου – On Wealth
- Πρὸς Δημόκριτον – Against Democritus
- Περὶ εὐγενείας – On Noble Birth

Metrodorus also wrote Against the Euthyphro, and Against the Gorgias of Plato. Small fragments of his work On Wealth, were found among the charred remains at the Villa of the Papyri at Herculaneum. Philodemus made use of this work in his own works On Wealth, and On Household Economics. Philodemus cites Metrodorus as the author of the view that Cynic poverty was to be rejected in favour of a more affluent way of life, although wealth in no way contributes to happiness.

== Sources ==
- Dorandi, Tiziano (1999). "Chapter 2: Chronology". In Algra, Keimpe; et al. (eds.). The Cambridge History of Hellenistic Philosophy. Cambridge: Cambridge University Press. p. 51. ISBN 9780521250283.
- Laërtius, Diogenes. "Epicurus" . Lives of the Eminent Philosophers. Vol. 2:10. Translated by Hicks, Robert Drew (Two volume ed.). Loeb Classical Library. § 1–154.
- Laërtius, Diogenes. "Metrodorus (subsection of Epicurus)" . Lives of the Eminent Philosophers. Vol. 2:10. Translated by Hicks, Robert Drew (Two volume ed.). Loeb Classical Library. § 22.

Attribution:
