= Basilides the Epicurean =

Basilides (or Basileides, Greek: Βασιλείδης; c. 250 – c. 175 BC) was an Epicurean philosopher, who succeeded Dionysius of Lamptrai as the head of the Epicurean school at Athens. c. 205 BC. It is not certain who succeeded Basilides: Apollodorus is the next Epicurean leader we can be certain about, but there may have been at least one intermediate leader, and the name Thespis has been suggested. Barnes and Brunschwig suggested that Basilides of Tyre and Basilides the Epicurean could be the same Basilides.

== See also ==
- List of Epicurean philosophers
