= Basilides of Tyre =

Basilides of Tyre (Ancient Greek: Βασιλείδης) was a mathematician, mentioned by Hypsicles in his prefatory letter of Euclid's Elements, Book XIV. Barnes and Brunschwig suggested that Basilides of Tyre and Basilides the Epicurean could be the same Basilides.

== Life ==
From Hypsicles letter it appears plausible that a Basilides of Tyre has met Hypsicles and his father, perhaps in Alexandria, a central point for mathematicians at the times. Basilides letter is part of the supplement taken from Euclid's Book XIV, written by Hypsicles.

Basilides of Tyre, O Protarchus, when he came to Alexandria and met my father, spent the greater part of his sojourn with him on account of the bond between them due to their common interest in mathematics. And on one occasion, when looking into the tract written by Apollonius (Apollonius of Perga) about the comparison of the dodecahedron and icosahedron inscribed in one and the same sphere, that is to say, on the question what ratio they bear to one another, they came to the conclusion that Apollonius' treatment of it in this book was not correct; accordingly, as I understood from my father, they proceeded to amend and rewrite it. But I myself afterwards came across another book published by Apollonius, containing a demonstration of the matter in question, and I was greatly attracted by his investigation of the problem. Now the book published by Apollonius is accessible to all; for it has a large circulation in a form which seems to have been the result of later careful elaboration. For my part, I determined to dedicate to you what I deem to be necessary by way of commentary, partly because you will be able, by reason of your proficiency in all mathematics and particularly in geometry, to pass an expert judgment upon what I am about to write, and partly because, on account of your intimacy with my father and your friendly feeling towards myself, you will lend a kindly ear to my disquisition. But it is time to have done with the preamble and to begin my treatise itself.

== See also ==
- Tyre, Lebanon
