= Themista of Lampsacus =

Ancient greek philosopher

Themista of Lampsacus (Greek: Θεμίστη), the wife of Leonteus, was a student of Epicurus, early in the 3rd century BC. Epicurus' school was unusual in the 3rd century, in that it welcomed women to attend, and we also hear of Leontion attending Epicurus' school around the same time. Cicero ridicules Epicurus for writing "countless volumes in praise of Themista," instead of men he deemed more worthy, such as Miltiades, Themistocles or Epaminondas. Themista and Leonteus named their son Epicurus.

At the time, Epicurus's school was seen as unusual for admitting women and slaves. Due to the scandalous nature of women being allowed to philosophize with men, the other philosopher's schools spent a bit of time attempting to discredit the school. Themista of Lampsacus, along with her contemporaries such as Leontion, were most likely called courtesans as a form of slander against the school itself, not because they were actually sex workers.
