= Amynomachus =

Amynomachus (fl. 3rd century BC), son of Philocrates, from the Attic deme of Bate was, together with Timocrates son of Demetrius from Potamos, the heir of Epicurus (ca. 270 BC). Whether they were Epicurean philosophers themselves is uncertain. Epicurus' property was given to them on condition that they give the Garden to Hermarchus and the other Epicureans. In this way Epicurus an Athenian citizen, ensures that Hermarchus and other non-Athenian Epicureans could remain in the Garden, although they cannot inherit legally the property.

Another Amynomachus, probably the grandfather of the heir (also Amynomachus son of Philocrates) appears in an epigraphic list of Athenian prytaneis (350 BC).
