= Demetrius Lacon =

Demetrius Lacon or Demetrius of Laconia (Greek: Δημήτριος; fl. late 2nd century BC) was an Epicurean philosopher, and a disciple of Protarchus. He was an older contemporary of Zeno of Sidon and a teacher of Philodemus. Sextus Empiricus quotes part of a commentary by Demetrius on Epicurus, where Demetrius interprets Epicurus' statement that "time is an accident of accidents."

Papyrus scrolls containing portions of the works of Demetrius were discovered at the Villa of the Papyri at Herculaneum. The major works partially preserved are:

- Quaestiones convivales (PHerc. 1006)
- On the Puzzles of Polyaenus (PHerc. 1083, 1258, 1429, 1642, 1647, 1822)
- On Geometry (PHerc. 1061)
- On Poems (PHerc. 188, 1014)
- two untitled works (PHerc. 1786, 124)

In addition, he is the probable author of the following works:

- On the Size of the Sun (PHerc. 1013)
- On Fickleness (PHerc. 831)
- an untitled work on textual criticism of Epicurus' writings (PHerc. 1012)
- an untitled theological work (PHerc. 1055)
- an untitled rhetorical work (PHerc. 128)
