= Phaedrus the Epicurean =

Phaedrus (/ˈfiːdrəs, ˈfɛdrəs/; Ancient Greek: Φαῖδρος; 138 – 70/69 BC) was an Epicurean philosopher. He was the head (scholarch) of the Epicurean school in Athens after the death of Zeno of Sidon around 75 BC, until his own death in 70 or 69 BC. He was a contemporary of Cicero, who became acquainted with him in his youth at Rome. During his residence in Athens (80 BC) Cicero renewed his acquaintance with him. Phaedrus was at that time an old man, and was already a leading figure of the Epicurean school. He was also on terms of friendship with Velleius, whom Cicero introduces as the defender of the Epicurean tenets in the De Natura Deorum, and especially with Atticus. Cicero especially praises his agreeable manners. He had a son named Lysiadas. Phaedrus was succeeded by Patro.

Cicero wrote to Atticus requesting Phaedrus' essay On gods (Greek: Περὶ θεῶν). Cicero used this work to aid his composition of the first book of the De Natura Deorum. Not only did he develop his account of Epicurean doctrine using it, but also the account of the doctrines of earlier philosophers.
