= Diogenes of Oenoanda =

2nd-century Greek Epicurean philosopher

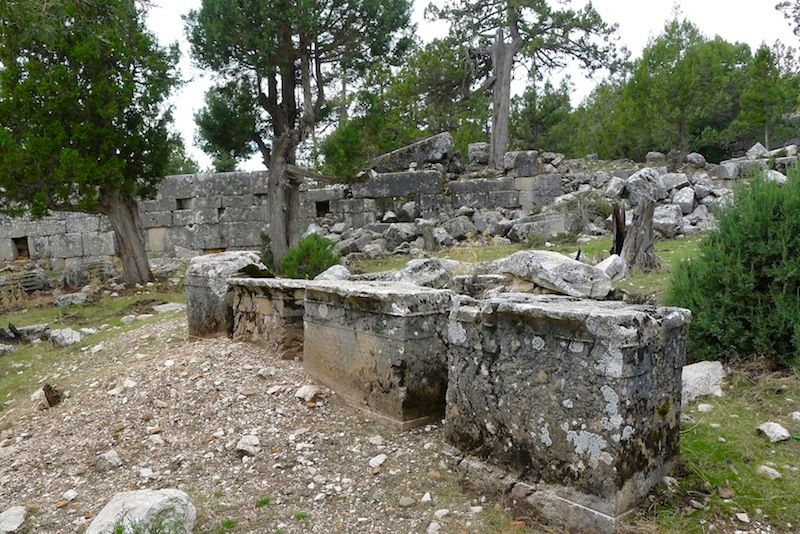
Parts of Diogenes' inscription

Diogenes of Oenoanda (/daɪˈɒdʒɪniːz/; Ancient Greek: Διογένης ὁ Οἰνοανδεύς) was an Epicurean Greek from the 2nd century AD who carved a summary of the philosophy of Epicurus onto a portico wall in the ancient Greek city of Oenoanda in Lycia (modern day southwest Turkey). The surviving fragments of the wall, originally extended about 80 meters, form an important source of Epicurean philosophy. The inscription, written in Greek, sets out Epicurus' teachings on physics, epistemology, and ethics. It was originally about 25,000 words long and filled 260 square meters of wall space. Less than a third of it has been recovered.

== Life ==
Nothing is known about the life of Diogenes apart from the limited information he reveals to us. The inscription itself, which had been dated to the late 2nd century, has now been assigned on epigraphic grounds to the Hadrianic period, 117–138 AD. Diogenes was wealthy enough to acquire a large tract of land in the city of Oenoanda to construct (or possibly buy) a stoa to display his inscription. As a man who had found peace by practicing the doctrines of Epicurus, he tells us that in his old age he was motivated "to help also those who come after us" and "to place therefore the remedies of salvation by means of this porch."

== The inscription ==
Diogenes constructed a rectangular stoa surrounded by a portico, and furnished with statues. On one of the smaller sides he placed a portal, with perhaps his mausoleum on the opposite side. On the two larger sides he inscribed a lengthy account of Epicurean doctrines. The inscription was 2.37 meters high, and extended about 80 meters. It was originally about 25 000 words long and filled about 260 square metres of wall space. It was discovered in 1884, and the first 64 fragments were published in 1892. Since then, more fragments have been discovered, notably in a series of excavations led by Martin Ferguson Smith. Perhaps a quarter of the inscription has been recovered. New parts are being discovered in the excavations of the Deutsches Archäologisches Institut; among the parts discovered in 2008 was a statement on Plato's theory of cosmogony.

The inscription contains three treatises written by Diogenes as well as various letters and maxims:

- A Treatise on Ethics, which describes how pleasure is the end of life; how virtue is a means to achieve it; and explains how to achieve the happy life.
- A Treatise on Physics, which has many parallels with Lucretius, and includes discussions on dreams, the gods, and contains an account of the origin of humans and the invention of clothing, speech and writing.
- A Treatise on Old Age, which appears to have defended old age against the jibes of the young, although little of this treatise survives.
- Letters from Diogenes to his friends, which includes a letter addressed to a certain Antipater concerning the Epicurean doctrine of innumerable worlds.
- Epicurean maxims, a collection of the sayings of Epicurus and other eminent Epicureans, which was appended to the end of the treatise on ethics.
- Letters of Epicurus, which includes a letter to Epicurus' mother on the subject of dreams.

Jürgen Hammerstaedt, philologist from the University of Cologne, and epigrapher Martin Ferguson Smith, have translated some of the fragments discovered in Oenoanda. "He was a remarkable man and a cosmopolitan man," says Hammerstaedt, commenting upon a quote from Smith's translation of a passage in which Diogenes declares that he set up the inscription: "Not least for those who are called foreigners, for they are not foreigners. For, while the various segments of the Earth give different people a different country, the whole compass of this world gives all people a single country, the entire Earth, and a single home, the world."
