= Catius =

Epicurean philosopher

Catius (fl. c. 50s–40s BC) was an Epicurean philosopher, identified ethnically as an Insubrian Celt from Gallia Transpadana. Epicurean works by Amafinius, Rabirius, and Catius were the earliest philosophical treatises written in Latin. Catius composed a treatise in four books on the physical world and on the highest good (De rerum natura et de summo bono). Cicero credits him, along with the lesser prose stylist Amafinius, with writing accessible texts that popularized Epicurean philosophy among the plebs, or common people.

== Sources ==
In a letter dated January 45 BC, Cicero speaks of Catius as having died recently. The letter is addressed to Cassius Longinus, one of the future assassins of Julius Caesar and a recent convert to Epicureanism. Cicero prods Cassius about his new philosophy, and jokes about spectra Catiana ("Catian apparitions"), that is, the εἴδωλα or material images which were supposed by the Epicureans to present themselves to the mind and to call up the idea of absent objects:

For somehow it makes you seem almost present when I write anything to you, and that not 'by way of phantoms of images,' as your new friends express it, who hold that 'mental pictures' are caused by what Catius called 'spectres' — for I must remind you that Catius Insuber the Epicurean, lately dead, calls 'spectres' what the famous Gargettius, and before him Democritus, used to call 'images.' Well, even if my eyes were capable of being struck by these 'spectres,' because they spontaneously run in upon them at your will, I do not see how the mind can be struck. You will be obliged to explain it to me, when you return safe and sound, whether the 'spectre' of you is at my command, so as to occur to me as soon as I have taken the fancy to think about you; and not only about you, who are in my heart's core, but supposing I begin thinking about the island of Britain — will its image fly at once into my mind? But of this later on. I am just sounding you now to see how you take it.

Although Cicero's purpose is ridicule, the passage is an important source for understanding the Epicurean theory of vision. Catius's spectrum is equivalent to simulacrum in Lucretius, but the term spectrum does not appear again in Latin until the 17th century and must represent Catius's attempt to create a specialized vocabulary.

Quintilian characterizes Catius briefly:

Among the Epicureans Catius is agreeable to read, though lacking in weight."

Early commentators on Horace assert that the philosopher should be identified with the Catius addressed in the fourth satire of the poet's second book. This Catius is introduced as delivering a grave and sententious lecture on various topics connected with the pleasures of the table. It appears from the words of Cicero, however, that the satire in question could not have been written until several years after the death of Catius. Horace may have intended to designate some gourmand of the court under a recognizably Epicurean nickname; given the poet's own Epicurean leanings, the passage should probably be read as a parody of the kind of false Epicureanism that disguised mere hedonism.

== See also ==
- Catia (gens)
