= Batis of Lampsacus =

Batis (or Bates) (Ancient Greek: Βατίς) of Lampsacus, was a student of Epicurus at Lampsacus in the early 3rd century BC. According to Diogenes Laertius, she was the sister of Metrodorus and wife of Idomeneus.

Seneca the Younger recounts that when Batis' son died, Metrodorus wrote a letter to his sister offering comfort, telling her that "all the Good of mortals is mortal," and "that there is a certain pleasure akin to sadness, and that one should give chase thereto at such times as these." Fragments of a letter from Epicurus to Batis on the death of Metrodorus in 277 BC have also been discovered among the papyri at Herculaneum. Some of the other fragments may have been written by Batis.
