= Carneiscus =

Greek Epicurean philosopher

Carneiscus (Greek: Καρνεῖσκος) was an Epicurean philosopher and disciple of Epicurus, who lived c. 300 BC. He is known as the author of an essay, fragments of which were found among the charred remains at the Villa of the Papyri at Herculaneum. The essay is entitled Philistas, and is a work on friendship which deals with a death of a friend. Philistas (or Philista) was a friend of Carneiscus, and she is presented as model Epicurean. Surviving fragments contain a polemic directed against Praxiphanes in which Carneiscus contrasts the Epicurean view of friendship and pleasure with the Peripatetic view outlined by Praxiphanes.
