= Timocrates of Lampsacus =

Timocrates of Lampsacus (Ancient Greek: Τιμοκράτης) was a renegade Epicurean who made it his life's mission to spread slander about Epicurus' philosophy and way of life. He was the elder brother of Metrodorus, Epicurus' best friend and most loyal follower, who was born in Lampsacus in the late 4th century BC. He studied with his brother in the school of Epicurus, but some time c. 290 BC, he broke with the school, apparently because he refused to accept that pleasure was the supreme good of life. The dispute became quite bitter; Philodemus quotes Timocrates saying "that he both loved his brother as no one else did and hated him as no one else." In a much quoted letter, Metrodorus, in exaggerated fashion, took Timocrates to task for not making the stomach the standard in everything relating to the prime good. Metrodorus wrote at least one work against Timocrates; and Epicurus also wrote an Opinions on the Passions, against Timocrates. In response, Timocrates wrote a polemic against Epicurus, whereby he claimed that Epicurus was not a genuine Athenian citizen, and that he was slovenly, weak, ignorant, rude, and vomited twice a day from overindulgence. His book against Epicurus, published after his apostasy, was entitled Delights (euphranta).
