= Alcaeus and Philiscus =

Two Epicurean philosophers

Alcaeus and Philiscus (or Alcius and Philiscus; fl. 2nd century BC) were two Epicurean philosophers who were expelled from Rome in either 173 BC or 154 BC.

Athenaeus states that the expulsion occurred during the consulship of Lucius Postumius. This can either refer to the Lucius Postumius who was consul in 173 BC or the Lucius Postumius who was consul in 154 BC. Aelian states that they were expelled "because they had introduced the younger generation to many unnatural pleasures." This may just be a hostile remark which originated from an anti-Epicurean source, but it is also possible that this was the charge laid against them. Roman law in this period permitted the expulsion (relegatio) of any undesired person from Rome by magisterial decree, and it was often used to remove undesirable foreigners from the city. In 161 BC some teachers of rhetoric and philosophy had been expelled from the city. In 155 BC, a celebrated embassy of philosophers, consisting of Carneades (Academic), Diogenes (Stoic) and Critolaus (Peripatetic), had been sent from Athens to Rome where their teachings caused a sensation, and they were forced to leave. If Alcaeus and Philiscus were expelled from the city in 154 BC, then it would have been just one year after this event.
