= Idomeneus of Lampsacus =

Early 3rd-century BC Greek philosopher

Idomeneus of Lampsacus (/aɪˈdɒmɪniəs/; Greek: Ἰδομενεύς Λαμψακηνός, romanized: Idomeneus Lampsakēnos; c. 325 – c. 270 BC) was a friend and disciple of Epicurus.

== Life ==
Little is known about his life, except that he married Batis of Lampsacus, the sister of Metrodorus, and he was a court dignitary at Lampsacus around 306–301 BC. Idomeneus wrote a considerable number of philosophical and historical works, and though the latter were not regarded as of very great authority, still they must have been of considerable value, as they seem to have been chiefly devoted to an account of the lives of the leading figures of Greece.

== Works ==
The titles of the following works of Idomeneus are mentioned:

- History of Samothrace (Greek: Ἱστορία τῶν κατὰ Σαμοθρᾴκην). This work is probably the one referred to by the Scholiast on Apollonius of Rhodes.
- On the Socratics (Greek: Περὶ τῶν Σωκρατικῶν), of which some fragments survive.

The title of one of the work or works of Idomeneus is not known, but it contained accounts of the following people: of the Peisistratidae, of Themistocles of Aristides, of Pericles, of Demosthenes, of Aeschines, of Hyperides, and of Phocion. It is possible that all these persons were mentioned in one work, to which modern writers have assigned various conjectural titles. The true title of the work may have been On the Athenian leaders (Greek: Περὶ τῶν Aθηνησι δημαγωγῶν).
