= Polystratus the Epicurean =

3rd-century BC Greek philosopher

Polystratus (Greek: Πολύστρατος; fl. 3rd century BC); died 219/18 BCE) was an Epicurean philosopher, and head (scholarch) of the Epicurean school in Athens. He succeeded Hermarchus as head of the sect c. 250 BC, and was himself succeeded by Dionysius of Lamptrai when he died 219 or 218 BC. Valerius Maximus relates that Polystratus and his friend Hippoclides (who is not otherwise known) were born on the same day, followed the sect of the same master Epicurus, shared their patrimony in common, and supported the school together, and at last died at the same moment in extreme old age.

Fragments of two of his works survive among the scrolls found at the Villa of the Papyri at Herculaneum. The first is On Irrational Contempt, which is a polemic directed "against those who irrationally despise popular beliefs." His opponents in the work may be the Cynics or the Skeptics. The second preserved work is entitled On Philosophy, of which only broken fragments can be deciphered.
