= Dionysius of Lamptrai =

Dionysius of Lamptrai (Ancient Greek: Διονύσιος; fl. 3rd century BC) was an Epicurean philosopher, who succeeded Polystratus as the head (scholarch) of the Epicurean school at Athens c. 219 BC. He died c. 205 BC and was succeeded by Basilides.
