= Apollodorus the Epicurean =

2nd century Greek philosopher

Apollodorus (Greek: Ἀπολλόδωρος; fl. 2nd century BC) was an Epicurean philosopher, and head of the Epicurean school in Athens.

According to Diogenes Laërtius, he was surnamed Tyrant of the Garden (Greek: Κηποτύραννος) from his exercising a kind of tyranny or supremacy in the garden or school of Epicurus. He was the teacher of Zeno of Sidon, who succeeded him as the head of the school, about 100 BC. He is said to have written upwards of 400 books, but they have all been lost.

Only two works are mentioned by title. One was called a Life of Epicurus. The other was a Collection of Doctrines, in which he asserted that Epicurus had written a greater amount of original writing than the Stoic Chrysippus, because although Chrysippus had written 700 books, they were filled with quotations from other authors.
