= Patro the Epicurean =

Patro (Greek: Πάτρων) was an Epicurean philosopher. He lived for some time in Rome, where he became acquainted, among others, with Cicero, and with the family of Gaius Memmius. At this point, or subsequently, he also gained the friendship of Atticus. From Rome he either removed or returned to Athens, and there succeeded Phaedrus as head of the Epicurean school, c. 70 BC. Memmius had, while in Athens, procured permission from the Areopagus court to pull down an old wall belonging to the property left by Epicurus for the use of his school. This was regarded by Patro as a sort of desecration, and he accordingly addressed himself to Atticus and Cicero, to induce them to use their influence with the Areopagus to get the decree rescinded. Atticus also wrote to Cicero on the subject. Cicero arrived at Athens the day after Memmius had departed for Mytilene. Finding that Memmius had abandoned his design of erecting the edifice with which the wall in question would have interfered, he consented to help in the matter; but thinking that the Areopagus would not retract their decree without the consent of Memmius, he wrote to the latter, urging his request in an elegant epistle, which is still in existence.
