= Rabirius (Epicurean) =

Rabirius was a 1st-century BC Epicurean associated with Amafinius and Catius as one of the early popularizers of the philosophy in Italy. Their works on Epicureanism were the earliest philosophical treatises written in Latin. Other than Lucretius, Amafinius and Rabirius are the only Roman Epicurean writers named by Cicero.

In his Academica, Cicero criticizes Amafinius and Rabirius from an elitist perspective for their unsophisticated prose style, and says that in their efforts to introduce philosophy to common people they end up saying nothing. He concludes indignantly: "they think there is no art of speechmaking or composition." Although Cicero in his writings is mostly hostile toward Epicureanism, his dear friend Atticus was an Epicurean, and this remark, occurring within a dialogue, is attributed to the interlocutor Varro, not framed as Cicero's own view.
