= Zeno of Sidon =

Greek philosopher – 1st Century BCE

Zenon
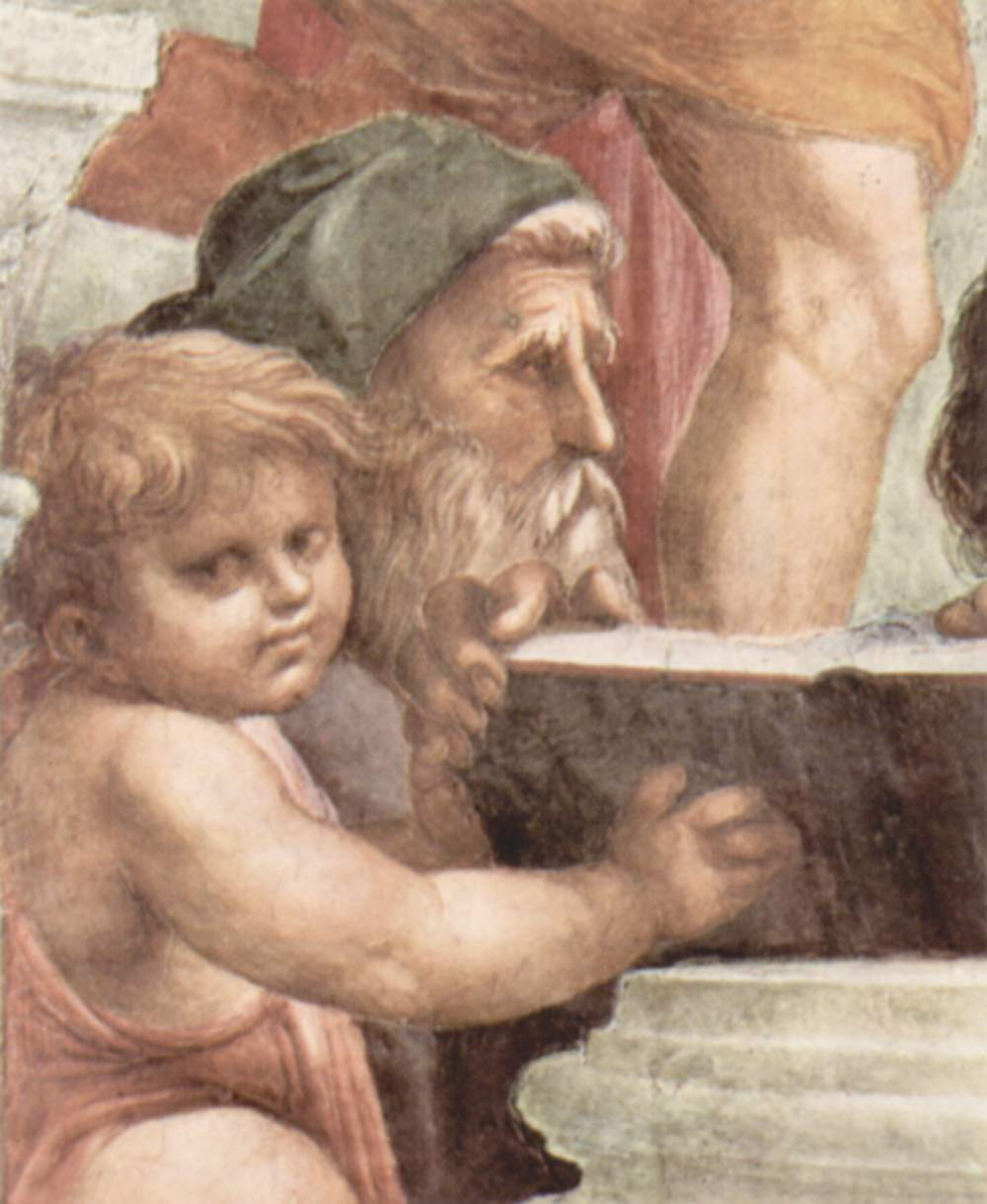
- Born: c. 150 BC; Sidon, Coele-Syria, Seleucid Empire
- Died: c. 75 BC prob. Athens
- Era: Hellenistic philosophy
- Region: Western philosophy
- School: Epicureanism
- Main interests: Ethics, mathematics

Zeno of Sidon (Ancient Greek: Ζήνων ὁ Σιδώνιος; c. 150 – c. 75 BC) was a Greek Epicurean philosopher from the Seleucid city of Sidon. His writings have not survived, but there are some epitomes of his lectures preserved among the writings of his pupil Philodemus.

== Life ==
Zeno was born in the city of Sidon. He was a contemporary of Cicero, who heard him when at Athens.

He was sometimes termed the "leading Epicurean." (Latin: Coryphaeus Epicureorum) Cicero states that Zeno was contemptuous of other philosophers, and even called Socrates "the Attic Buffoon (scurram Atticum)." He was a disciple of Apollodorus, and Cicero and Diogenes Laërtius both describe him as an accurate and polished thinker.

== Philosophy ==
Zeno held that happiness is not merely dependent upon present enjoyment and prosperity, but also on a reasonable expectation of their continuance and appreciation.

Zeno's writings have not survived, but among the charred papyrus remains at the Villa of the Papyri at Herculaneum, there is an Epitome of Conduct and Character from the Lectures of Zeno written by his pupil Philodemus. It contains the essays On Frank Criticism and On Anger.

Zeno also studied the philosophy of mathematics based on the derivation of all knowledge from experience. He criticized Euclid, seeking to show that deductions from the fundamental principles (Koinē Greek: ἀρχαί) of geometry cannot, on their own, be proved:

[Some] admit the principles but deny that the propositions coming after the principles can be demonstrated unless they grant something that is not contained in the principles. This method of controversy was followed by Zeno of Sidon, who belonged to the school of Epicurus, and against whom Posidonius has written a whole book.
