= Leontion =

Ancient Greek philosopher

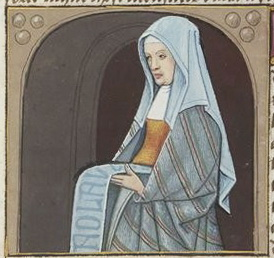
Ill. from De mulieribus claris

Leontion (Latin: Leontium, Greek: Λεόντιον; fl. 300 BC) was a notable Greek Epicurean philosopher and student of Epicurus's Garden School. She is known for her authored work against Theophrastus, the head of the Aristotelian school. The manuscript she wrote has been lost over time, but it has been written about by many philosophers over the centuries, including Cicero and Pliny the Elder.

== Biography ==
Leontion was a pupil of Epicurus and his philosophy. She was the companion of Metrodorus of Lampsacus. The information we have about her is scant. She was said to have been a hetaira – a courtesan or prostitute.^{a}

There is evidence that she was not a hetaira, and that the label was used merely as slander by other schools of philosophy to discredit the Epicurean school. At the time, it was very unusual for a school to accept women, non-citizens, slaves, and those without means or social status into its ranks to philosophize against men. This plus the Epicurean schools belief of "immunity by quiet life and retirement from the world" led to many unchallenged rumors to spread in Athenian society.

Alexandrian teacher Aelius Theon (fl. c. 50 AD) portrayed her in his Progymnasmata as a prime example of someone from a low social class who achieved great things.

Diogenes Laërtius has preserved a line from a letter that Epicurus evidently wrote to Leontion, in which Epicurus praises her for her well-written arguments against certain philosophical views (which aren't mentioned in Diogenes' quote). According to Pliny, she was painted by Aristides of Thebes in a work entitled "Leontion of Epicurus," and again by a certain Theorus (or Theodorus) in a work entitled "Leontion of Epicurus, thinking."

According to Cicero, Leontion is said to have published arguments criticizing the famous philosopher Theophrastus:

Leontium, that mere courtesan, who had the effrontery to write a riposte to Theophrastus – mind you, she wrote elegantly in good Attic, but still, this was the licence which prevailed in the Garden of Epicurus.

This anecdote was later adopted by Pliny, in the preface of his Naturalis historia.

"On one point everyone seems to have agreed: even the most critical portrayals of Leontion were obliged to acknowledge her intelligence. At the very least, medieval writers were impressed that they were still talking about Leontion, in some cases more than a millennium after her death."

== Notes ==
1.The extent to which hetairai were courtesans or prostitutes is disputed.
