= Amafinius =

Roman writer

Gaius Amafinius (or Amafanius) was one of the earliest Roman writers in favour of the Epicurean philosophy. He probably lived in the late 2nd and early 1st century BC. He wrote several works, which are censured by Cicero as deficient in arrangement and style. He is mentioned by no other ancient writer but Cicero. In the Academica, Cicero reveals that Amafinius translated the Greek concept of atoms as corpusculi ("corpuscles") in Latin.

In his Tusculan Disputations, Cicero disapprovingly notes that Amafanius was one of the first philosophers writing in Latin at Rome:

But, during this silence, C. Amafinius arose and took upon himself to speak; on the publishing of whose writings the people were moved, and enlisted themselves chiefly under this sect, either because the doctrine was more easily understood, or because they were invited thereto by the pleasing thoughts of amusement, or that, because there was nothing better, they laid hold of what was offered them.

In his Academica, Cicero criticizes Amafinius and his fellow Epicurean Rabirius for their unsophisticated prose style, and says that in their efforts to introduce philosophy to common people they end up saying nothing. He concludes indignantly: "they think there is no art of speechmaking or composition."

Michel de Montaigne alludes to these passages in his Essais, book 2, chapter 17, De la presumption ("On Presumption.") Montaigne writes:

. . ."a popular jargon, a proceeding without definition, division, conclusion, perplexed like that Amafanius and Rabirius."

== Bibliography ==
- Cicero’s Social and Political Thought, Wood, Neal, University of California Press, 1988 (paperback edition, 1991, ISBN 0-520-07427-0).
- Amafinius, Lucretius and Cicero, Howe, H.H., American Journal of Philology, 77, 1951, pp57–62
