= Principal Doctrines =

Tenants of Epicureanism

The Principal Doctrines (Greek: Κύριαι δόξαι, Kyriai doxai) are forty authoritative conclusions set up as official doctrines by the founders of Epicureanism: Epicurus of Samos, Metrodorus of Lampsacus, Hermarchus of Mitilene and Polyaenus of Lampsacus. The first four doctrines make up the Tetrapharmakos (Four Cures), which have sometimes been compared to Buddhism's Four Noble Truths.

Some of the Principal Doctrines ("PDs") are organized into groups and are meant to be studied together. PDs 10-13 discuss the Epicurean philosophy of science. PDs 18-21 explain the natural limits of desires and in time, and how the flesh is unable to learn these limits but the mind can. PDs 22-25 deal with the importance of the canon, or the Epicurean standard of truth. PDs 31-38 explain the Epicurean doctrines on justice based on mutual advantage and contractarianism. PDs 39-40 call for an intimate society of friends.

Since most of Epicurus' 37 books "On Nature" are lost to us, the Principal Doctrines are, together with Epicurus' Letters to Herodotus, Menoeceus, and Pythocles, the most authoritative writings in Epicureanism. The Principal Doctrines exemplify the Epicurean philosophers' practice of publishing summaries and outlines of their teachings for easy memorization. However, they are so concise and short that it's difficult to understand them in depth without the context of additional commentaries and writings by ancient sources or by modern Epicurean practitioners, whenever possible.

In his work "Alexander the Oracle Monger", comedian Lucian of Samosata praised the PDs saying: "What blessings this book creates for its readers and what peace, tranquillity, and freedom it engenders in them, liberating them as it does from terrors and apparitions and portents, from vain hopes and extravagant cravings, developing in them intelligence and truth, and truly purifying their understanding, not with torches and squills and that sort of foolery, but with straight thinking, truthfulness and frankness."

== Tetrapharmakos ==
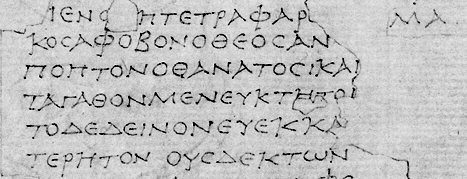
The tetrapharmakos as found in the Herculaneum papyrus in the Villa of the Papyri.

The Tetrapharmakos (τετραφάρμακος) "four-part remedy" is a summary of the first four doctrines. These are short recommendations to avoid anxiety or existential dread.

The "tetrapharmakos" was originally a compound of four drugs (wax, tallow, pitch and resin); the word has been used metaphorically by Roman-era Epicureans to refer to the four remedies for healing the soul.

As expressed by Philodemos, and preserved in a Herculaneum Papyrus (1005, 5.9–14), the tetrapharmakos reads:

Don't fear god,

Don't worry about death;

What is good is easy to get,

What is terrible is easy to endure

Ἄφοβον ὁ θεός,

ἀνύποπτον ὁ θάνατος

καὶ τἀγαθὸν μὲν εὔκτητον,

τὸ δὲ δεινὸν εὐεκκαρτέρητον

This is a summary of the first four doctrines:

1. A happy and eternal being has no trouble himself and brings no trouble upon any other being; hence he is exempt from movements of anger and partiality, for every such movement implies weakness
2. Death is nothing to us; for the body, when it has been resolved into its elements, has no feeling, and that which has no feeling is nothing to us.
3. The magnitude of pleasure reaches its limit in the removal of all pain. When pleasure is present, so long as it is uninterrupted, there is no pain either of body or of mind or of both together.
4. Continuous pain does not last long in the body; on the contrary, pain, if extreme, is present a short time, and even that degree of pain which barely outweighs pleasure in the body does not last for many days together. Illnesses of long duration even permit of an excess of pleasure over pain in the body.

=== Don't fear god ===
In Epicurean philosophy, the gods were conceived as hypothetical beings in a perpetual state of bliss, indestructible entities that are completely invulnerable. Gods in this view are mere role models for human beings, who are to "emulate the happiness of the gods, within the limits imposed by human nature."

=== Don't worry about death ===
As D. S. Hutchinson wrote concerning this line, "While you are alive, you don't have to deal with being dead, but when you are dead you don't have to deal with it either, because you aren't there to deal with it." In Epicurus' own words in his Letter to Menoeceus, "Death (...) is nothing to us, seeing that, when we are, death is not come, and, when death is come, we are not," for there is no afterlife. Death, says Epicurus, is the greatest anxiety of all, in length and intensity. This anxiety about death impedes the quality and happiness of one's life by the theory of afterlife: the worrying about whether or not one's deeds and actions in life will translate well into the region of the gods, the wondering whether one will be assigned to an eternity of pain or to an eternity of pleasure.

=== What is good is easy to get ===
Sustenance and shelter, these things can be acquired by anyone — by both animal and human — with minimal effort, regardless of wealth. But if one wants more than one needs (over indulgency, gluttony, etc.), one is limiting the chances of satisfaction and happiness, and therefore creating a “needless anxiety” in one’s life. "What is good is easy to get" implies that the minimum amount of necessity it takes to satisfy an urge is the maximum amount of interest a person should have in satisfying that urge.

=== What is terrible is easy to endure ===
The Epicureans understand that, in nature, illness and pain is not suffered for very long, for pain and suffering is either "brief or chronic ... either mild or intense, but discomfort that is both chronic and intense is very unusual; so there is no need to be concerned about the prospect of suffering." Like "What is good is easy to get," recognizing one's physical and mental limit and one's threshold of pain — understanding how much pain the body or mind can endure — and maintaining confidence that pleasure only follows pain (and the avoidance of anxiety about the length of pain), is the remedy against prolonged suffering.
