= Polyaenus (disambiguation) =

The name Polyaenus or Polyenus (Greek: Πoλύαινoς, romanized: Poluainos, lit. 'many proverbs') may refer to:

- Polyaenus of Sardis, a Greek sophist active in the 1st century BC. He wrote judicial speeches, outlines of legal cases, a three book work entitled Parthian Triumph (Θριάμβου Παρθητικου̂) and other.
- Polyaenus, 2nd century Macedonian author
- Polyaenus of Lampsacus (c. 340 – 278 BC), Greek mathematician
- Polyaenus (wasp), a genus of wasp
