= 380 (disambiguation) =

380 may refer to:

- 380 (number), the natural number and/or integer
- Western-calendar years:
  - 380 (AD or CE)
  - 380 BC
- Products:
  - Airbus A380, double-deck, four-engined airliner
  - 380 bulb, 12V dual-brightness (21W/5W, typically automotive) light bulb
  - .380 ACP, a rimless, straight-walled pistol cartridge
- Hung Shui Kiu stop, Hong Kong; station code
- ".380" (Daredevil)

== See also ==
- 380th (disambiguation)
