= Lampsacus =

Ancient Greek city located on the eastern side of the Hellespont in the northern Troad

- Λάμψακος (Ancient Greek)
- Pityusa, Pityussa, Lampsakos
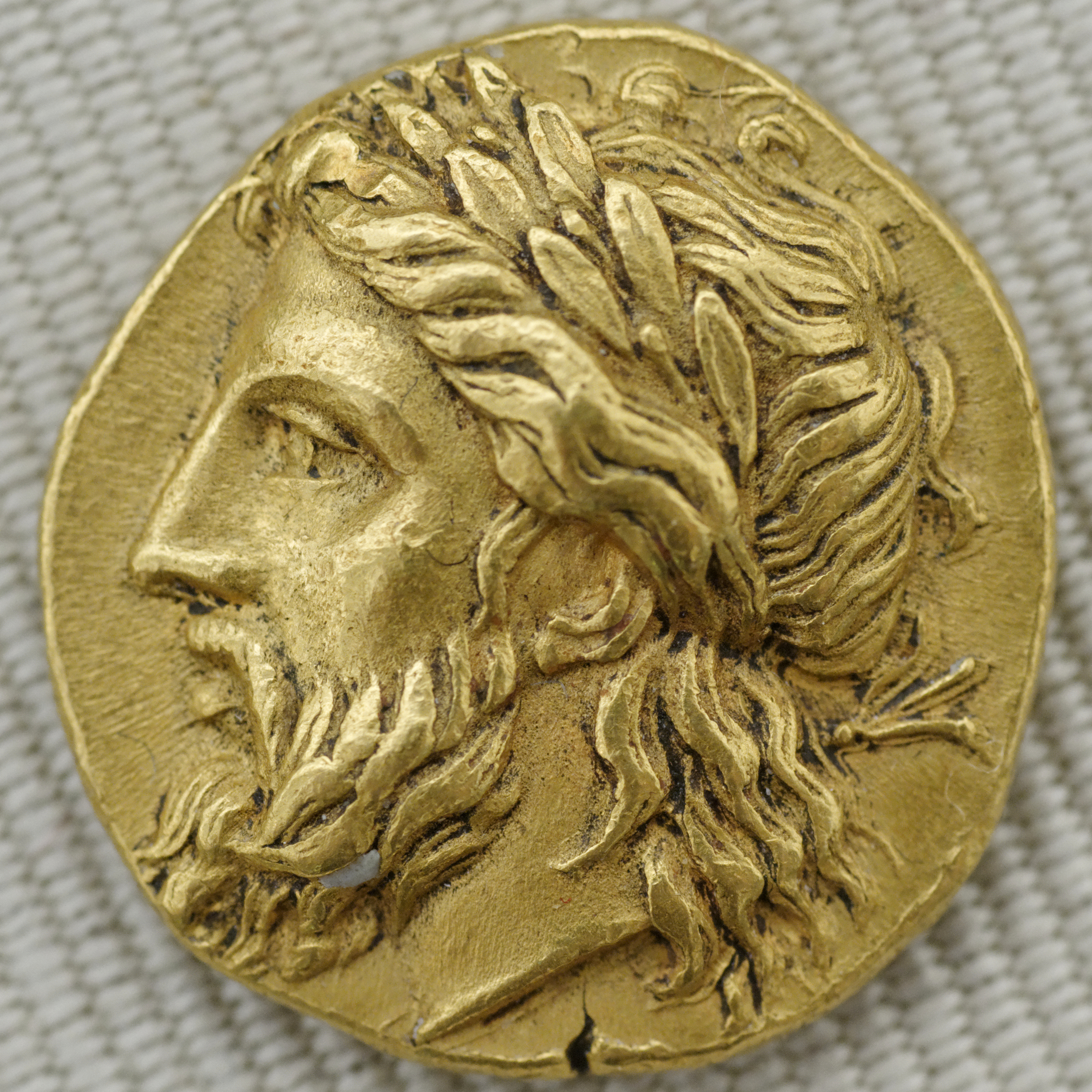
- Gold stater of Lampsacus, c. 360–340 BC, with the laurel-wreathed head of Zeus Lampsacus

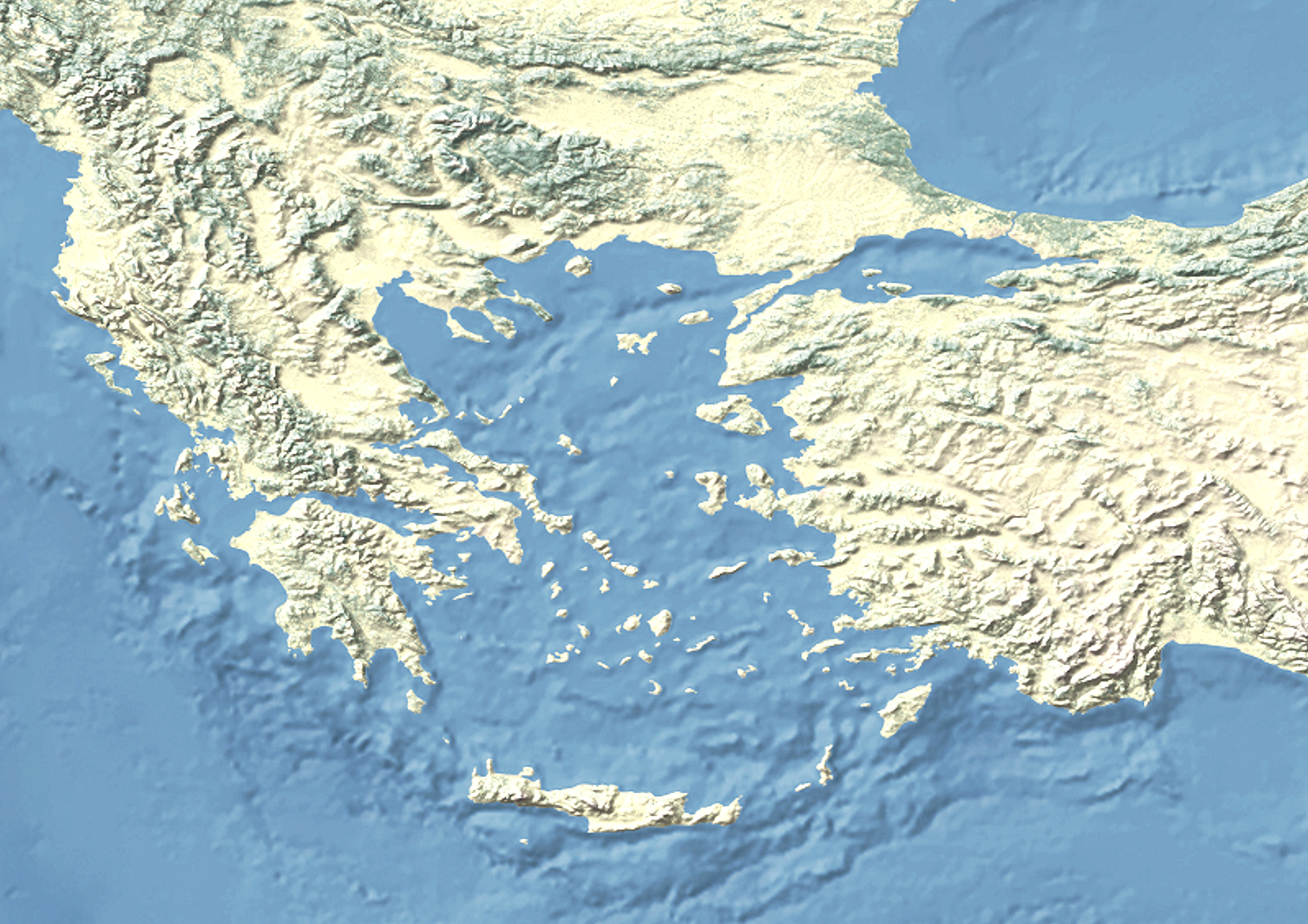
- Location within The Aegean Sea area
- 40°20′48″N 26°41′57″E
- Type: Settlement
- Location: Lapseki, Çanakkale Province, Turkey
- Region: Troad

History
- Built by: Colonists from Phocaea and Miletus

Lampsacus (/ˈlæmsəkəs/; Ancient Greek: Λάμψακος, romanized: Lampsakos) was an ancient Greek city located in modern day Turkey, situated on the eastern side of the Hellespont in the northern Troad. An inhabitant of Lampsacus was called a Lampsacene. The name has been transmitted in the nearby modern town of Lapseki.

== Ancient history ==
Originally known as Pityusa or Pityussa (Ancient Greek: Πιτυούσ(σ)α), it was colonized from Phocaea and Miletus. In the 6th century BC Lampsacus was attacked by Miltiades the Elder and Stesagoras, the Athenian tyrants of the nearby Thracian Chersonese. During the 6th and 5th centuries BC, Lampsacus was successively dominated by Lydia, Persia, Athens, and Sparta. The Greek tyrants Hippoclus and later his son Acantides ruled under Darius I. Artaxerxes I assigned it to Themistocles with the expectation that the city supply the Persian king with its famous wine. When Lampsacus joined the Delian League after the battle of Mycale (479 BC), it paid a tribute of twelve talents, a testimony to its wealth; it had a gold coinage in the 4th century, an activity only available to the more prosperous cities.

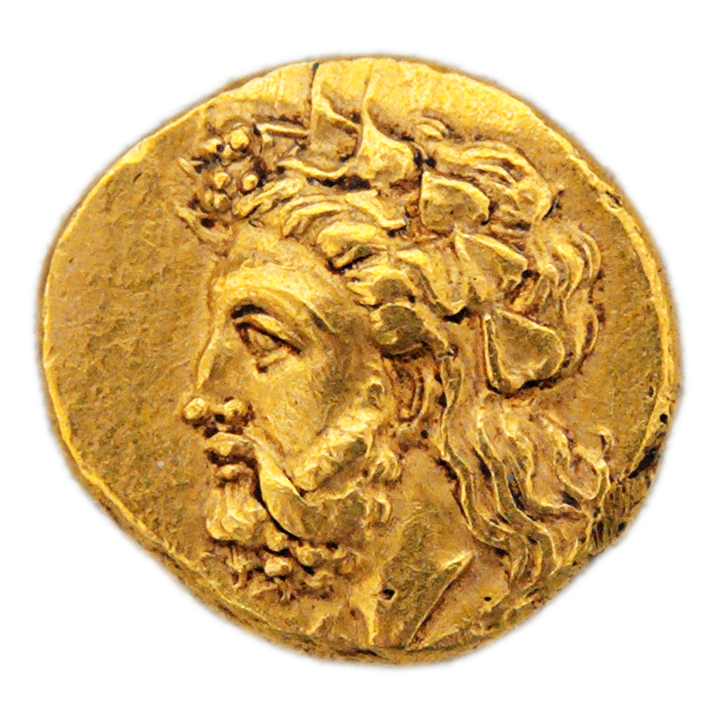
Gold stater of Lampsacus with the ivy-wreathed head of Dionysus/Priapus, c. 360–340 BC

A revolt against the Athenians in 411 BC was put down by force. In 196 BC, the Romans defended the town against Antiochus the Great, and it became an ally of Rome; Cicero (2 Verr. i. 24. 63) and Strabo (13. 1. 15) attest its continuing prosperity under Roman rule. Lampsacus was also notable for its worship of Priapus, who was said to have been born there.

The philosopher Anaxagoras was forced to retire to Lampsacus after a trial in Athens around 434–433 BC. The citizens of Lampsacus erected an altar to Mind and Truth in his honor, and observed the anniversary of his death for many years. Additionally, in his honor, the annual celebration known as the Anaxagoreia was established.

The people of Lampsacus were pro-Persian, or were suspected of being so and Alexander the Great was furiously angry, and threatened to do them massive harm. They sent Anaximenes of Lampsacus to intercede for them. Alexander knew why he had come, and swore by the gods that he would do the opposite of what he would ask, so Anaximenes said, 'Please do this for me, your majesty: enslave the women and children of Lampsacus, burn their temples, and raze the city to the ground.' Alexander had no way round this clever trick, and since he was bound by his oath he reluctantly pardoned the people of Lampsacus.

Lampsacus produced a series of notable historians and philosophers. Charon of Lampsacus (c. 500 BC) composed histories of Persia, Libya, and Ethiopia, and annals of his native town. Metrodorus of Lampsacus (the elder) (5th century BC) was a philosopher from the school of Anaxagoras. Strato of Lampsacus (c. 335 – c. 269 BC) was a Peripatetic philosopher and the third director of Aristotle's Lyceum at Athens. Euaeon of Lampsacus was one of Plato's students. A group of Lampsacenes were in the circle of Epicurus; they included Polyaenus of Lampsacus (c. 340 – 278 BC) a mathematician, the philosophers Idomeneus of Lampsacus, Colotes the satirist and Leonteus of Lampsacus; Batis of Lampsacus the wife of Idomeneus, was the sister of Metrodorus of Lampsacus (the younger), whose elder brother, also a friend of Epicurus, was Timocrates of Lampsacus. Anaximenes of Lampsacus, a rhetorician and historian. His nephew (son of his sister), was also named Anaximenes and was a historian. Aristocles (Ἀριστοκλῆς) of Lampsacus was a stoic philosopher. Xenophon of Lampsacus was a geographer.

The people of Lampsacus dedicated a statue of Anaximenes of Lampsacus at Olympia, Greece.

== Christian history ==
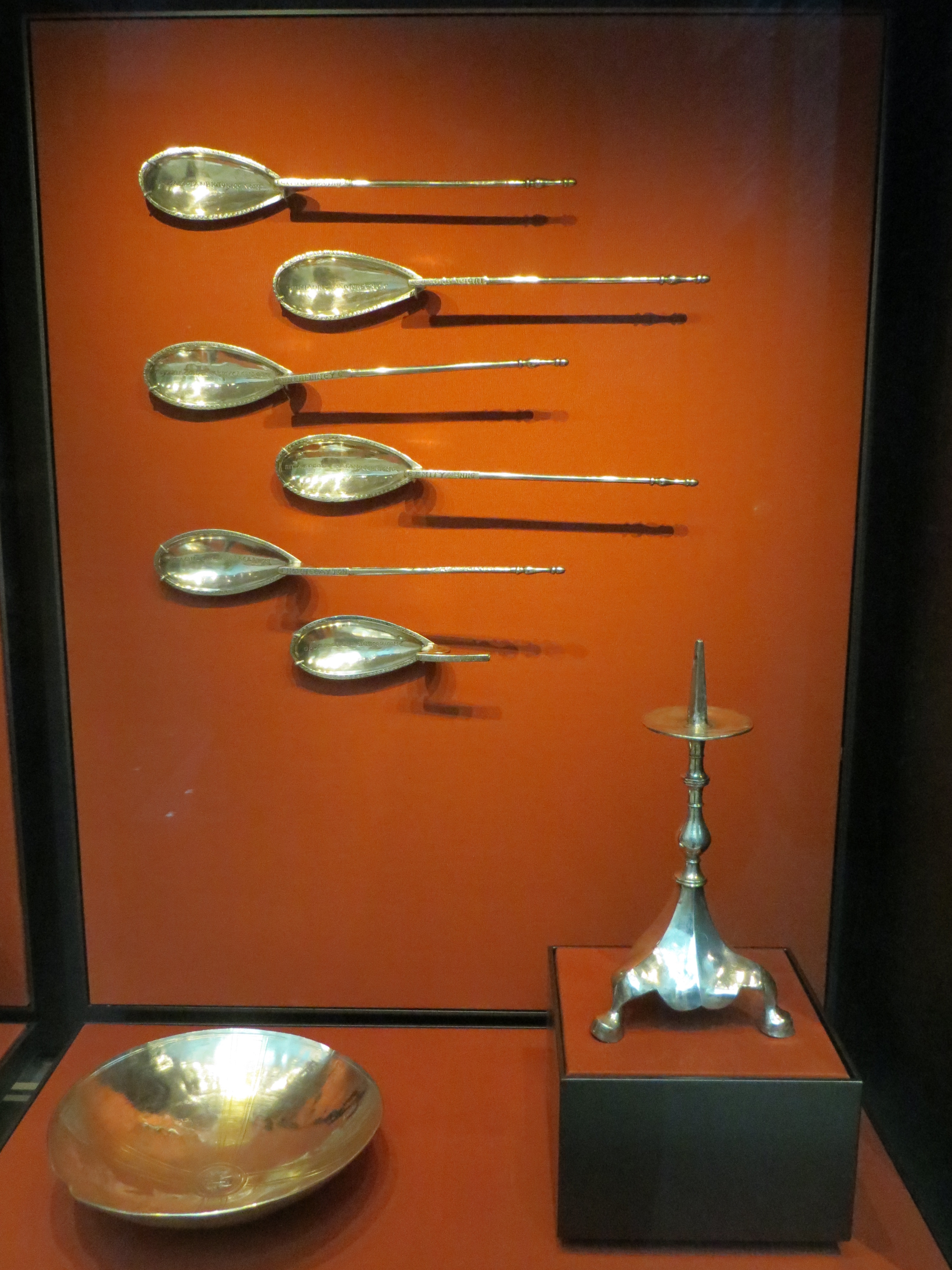
Part of the Lampsacus Treasure as currently displayed in the British Museum

According to legend, St Tryphon was buried at Lampsacus after his martyrdom at Nicaea in 250.

The first known bishop in Lampsacus was Parthenius, under Constantine I. Part of the Hellespont, Lampsacus was subject to the metropolis of Cyzicus. In 364, the see was occupied by Marcian and in the same year a council of bishops was held at Lampsacus. Marcian was summoned to the First Council of Constantinople of Constantinople in 381, but refused to retract his adherence of the Macedonian Christian sect. Other known Bishops of Lampsacus were Daniel, who assisted at the Council of Chalcedon (451); Harmonius (458); Constantine (680), who attended the Third Council of Constantinople; John (787), at Nicaea; St. Euschemon, a correspondent of St. Theodore the Studite, and a confessor of the Faith for the veneration of images, under Theophilus. The See of Lampsacus is mentioned in the "Notitiae Episcopatuum" until about the 12th or 13th century. The famous Lampsacus Treasure, now in the British Museum, dates from this period. The bishopric remains a vacant and titular see.

== See also ==
- List of ancient Greek cities
- List of traditional Greek place names
- Lampsace
- Anaximenes of Lampsacus
- Polyaenus of Lampsacus
- Metrodorus of Lampsacus (the younger)
- Abramios the Recluse
