= AD 360 =

360 in various calendars
Gregorian calendar	360; CCCLX
Ab urbe condita	1113
Assyrian calendar	5110
Balinese saka calendar	281–282
Bengali calendar	−234 – −233
Berber calendar	1310
Buddhist calendar	904
Burmese calendar	−278
Byzantine calendar	5868–5869
Chinese calendar	己未年 (Earth Goat); 3057 or 2850 — to — 庚申年 (Metal Monkey); 3058 or 2851
Coptic calendar	76–77
Discordian calendar	1526
Ethiopian calendar	352–353
Hebrew calendar	4120–4121
- Hindu calendars
Vikram Samvat	416–417
Shaka Samvat	281–282
Kali Yuga	3460–3461
Holocene calendar	10360
Iranian calendar	262 BP – 261 BP
Islamic calendar	270 BH – 269 BH
Javanese calendar	242–243
Julian calendar	360; CCCLX
Korean calendar	2693
Minguo calendar	1552 before ROC 民前1552年
Nanakshahi calendar	−1108
Seleucid era	671/672 AG
Thai solar calendar	902–903
Tibetan calendar	ས་མོ་ལུག་ལོ་ (female Earth-Sheep); 486 or 105 or −667 — to — ལྕགས་ཕོ་སྤྲེ་ལོ་ (male Iron-Monkey); 487 or 106 or −666

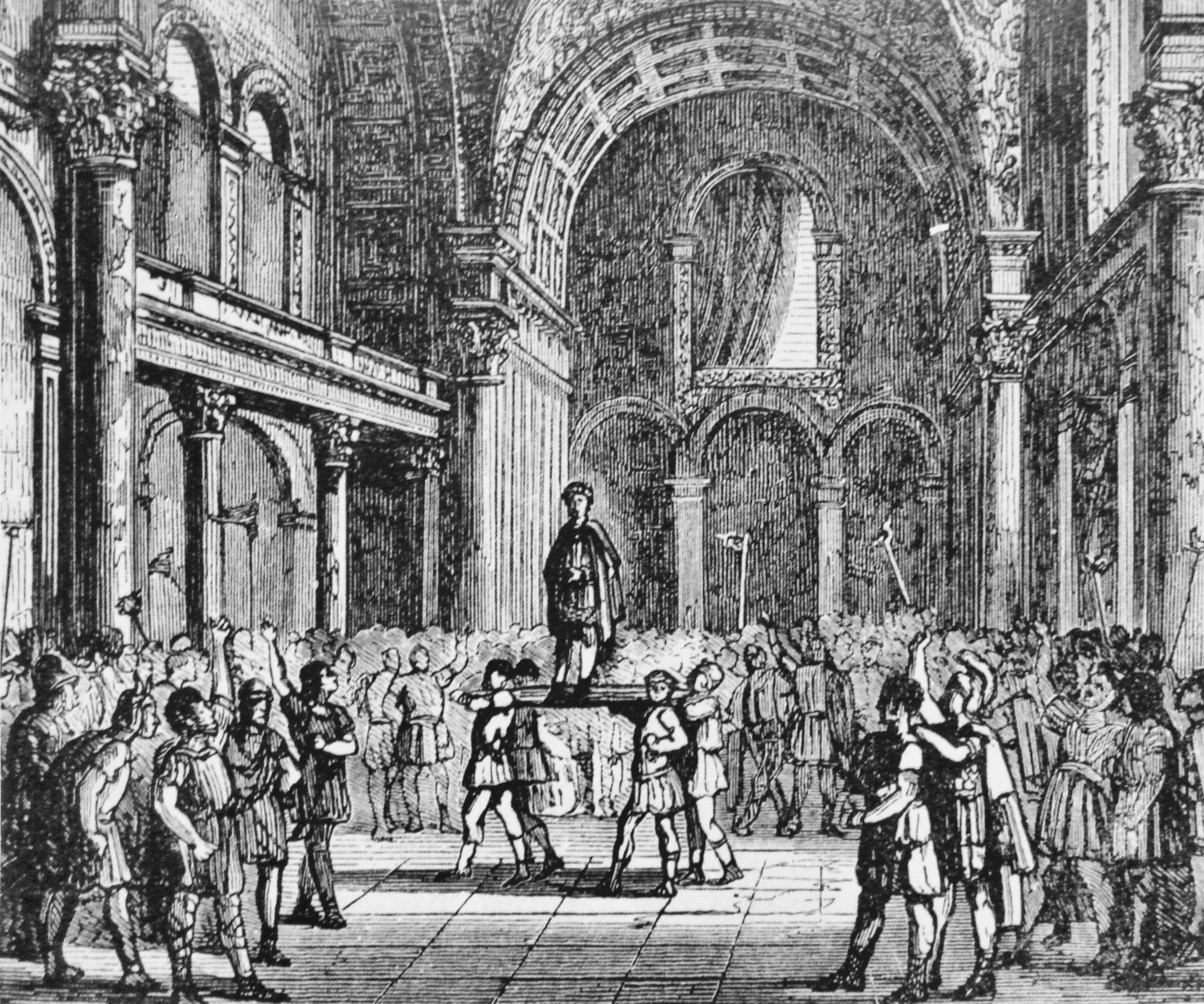
Julian is proclaimed Emperor in Paris at the Thermes de Cluny

Year 360 (CCCLX) was a leap year starting on Saturday of the Julian calendar. At the time, it was known as the Year of the Consulship of Constantius and Iulianus (or, less frequently, year 1113 Ab urbe condita). The denomination 360 for this year has been used since the early medieval period, when the Anno Domini calendar era became the prevalent method in Europe for naming years.

== Events ==
=== By place ===
==== Roman Empire ====
- February – Julian, Roman Caesar, is proclaimed emperor in Lutetia (modern Paris).
- The Alamanni raid Raetia (Switzerland), but are pushed back behind the Rhine by Julian, into the Black Forest.
- King Shapur II continues his campaign against the Roman fortresses, capturing Singara, Bezabde and Nisibis.
- Emperor Constantius II and Julian exchange several letters, both hoping to avoid a civil war.

==== Europe ====
- The Huns invade the Pontic steppes by the thousands, spreading terror as they take over territories held for generations by Alans, Heruls, Ostrogoths and Visigoths.

=== By topic ===
==== Agriculture ====
- Roman authorities in Britain export wheat to supply the legions on the Rhine; they have encouraged production of wheat for that purpose.

==== Religion ====
- 14 February – The first Hagia Sophia church is consecrated in Constantinople.
- Council of Constantinople (360): Emperor Constantius II requests a church council, at Constantinople; both the eastern and western bishops attend the meeting. Ulfilas also attends the council and endorses the resulting creed. After the council several homoiousian bishops are deposed or banished, including Macedonius I of Constantinople and Cyril of Jerusalem.
- At about this date, Ligugé Abbey in France is founded for the monastic Order of Saint Benedict by Martin of Tours, under dispensation from Bishop Hilary of Poitiers.

== Births ==
- John Cassian, Desert Father and Christian saint (approximate date)
- Saint Mesrob, Armenian monk and theologian (approximate date)
- Saint Ninian, missionary to Scotland (approximate date)
- Tao Sheng, Chinese Buddhist scholar (approximate date)
- Wang Fahui, empress during the Jin Dynasty (d. 380)

== Deaths ==
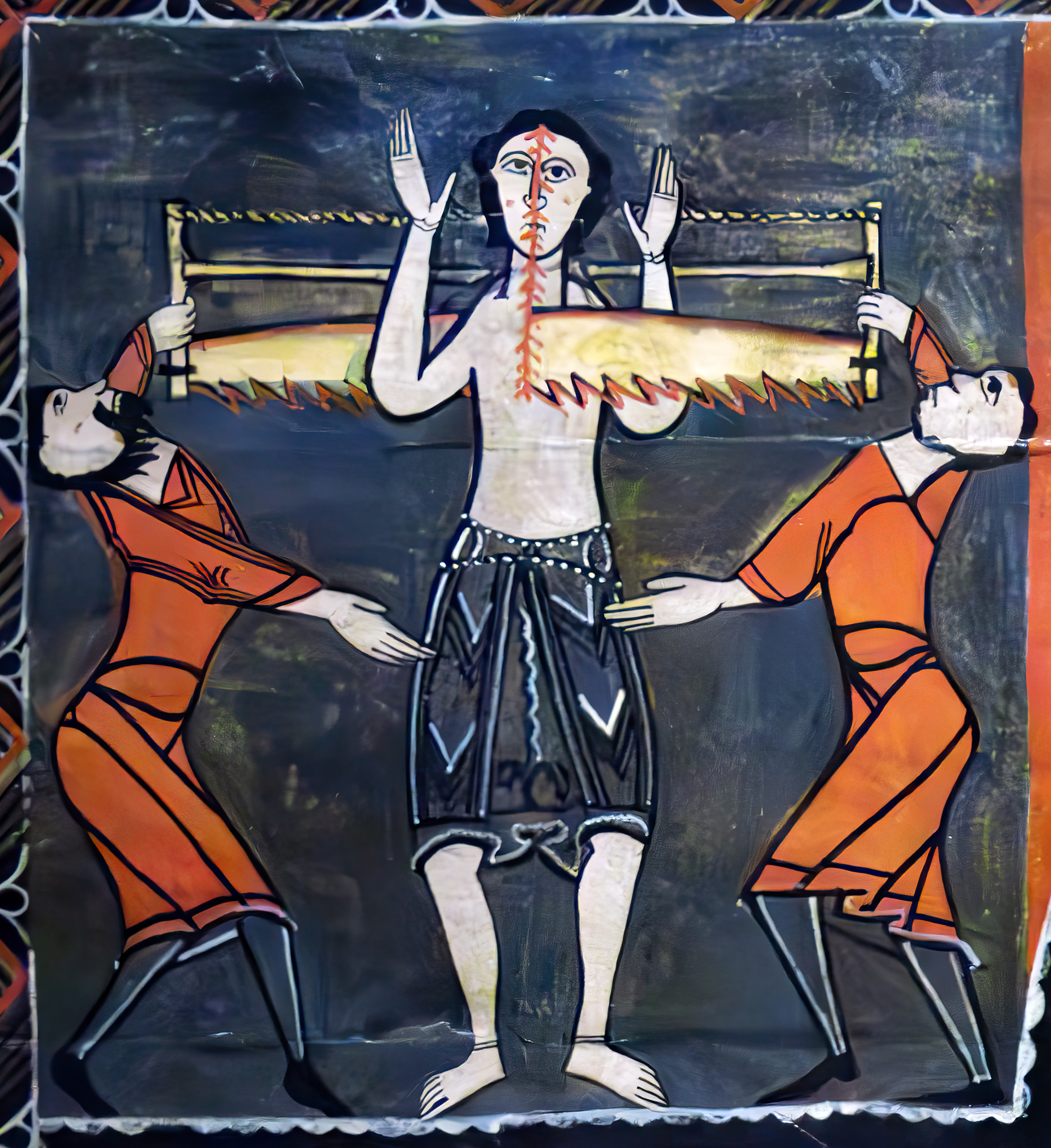
Saint Judas Cyriacus

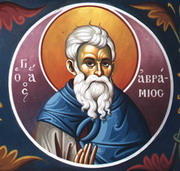
Saint Abramios the Recluse

- May 4 – Judas Cyriacus, Roman Catholic priest and saint
- October 14 – Gaudentius of Rimini, Roman Catholic priest and saint
- November 11 – Abramios the Recluse, Byzantine Orthodox priest and saint
- December 18 – Auxentius of Mopsuestia, Byzantine Orthodox priest and saint

=== Date unknown ===
- Eusebius of Emesa, Byzantine Orthodox bishop and saint (b. 290)
- Murong Jun, emperor of the Former Yan (b. 319)
