= Lapseki =

- Municipality
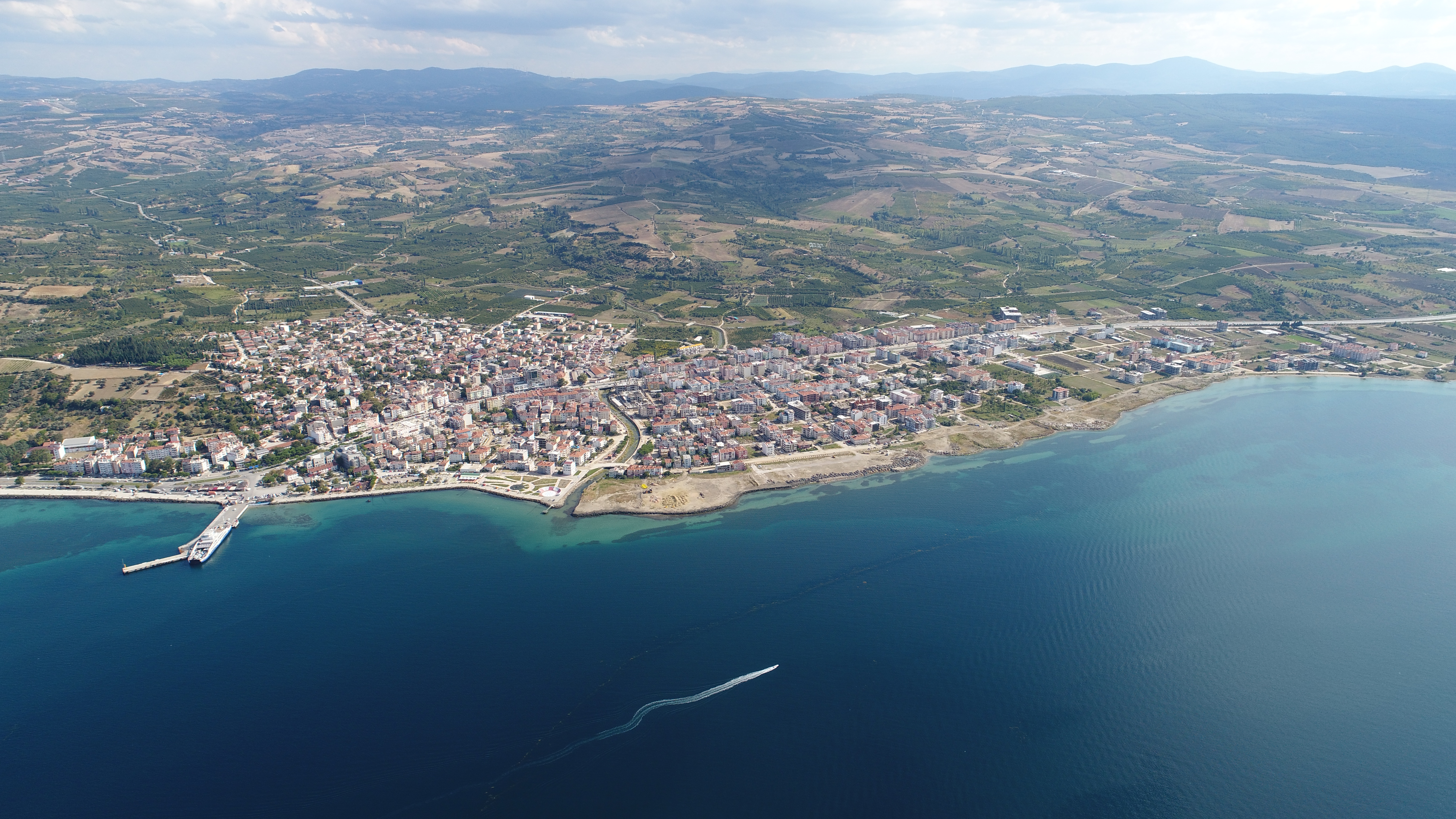

- Location within Turkey Location within Marmara
- Coordinates: 40°20′38″N 26°41′01″E
- Country: Turkey
- Province: Çanakkale
- District: Lapseki

Government
  - Mayor: Atilla Öztürk (İYİ)
- Elevation: 0 m (0 ft)
- Population (2021): 14,984
- Time zone: UTC+3 (TRT)
- Area code: 0286
- Website: www.lapseki.bel.tr

Lapseki (from Greek: Λάμψακος, Lampsakos) is a town in Çanakkale Province, Turkey. It is the seat of Lapseki District. Its population is 14,984 (2021). The mayor is Atilla Öztürk (iYi).

The district of Lapseki is known for its cherries, and a cherry festival is held annually in the town.

== History ==
The town was founded by Greek colonists from Phocaea in the 6th century BC, one of 4 settlements along the Dardanelles at that time. Soon afterwards it became a competitor of Miletus, controlling the trade routes in the Dardanelles. The modern Turkish name derives from the original Greek name.

Ancient Greek legend says that while the city was under the rule of King Mandron and named Pityussa, the king, who defended the colonists from Phocaea from the attacks of the local people, minted coins for the first time in its history in the name of his daughter Lampsace and later the city was given this name by the colonists to express their indebtedness to him. In this way, the name Lampsakos, then Lapseki, was passed down to the present day.

The city was under the Byzantines for a long period before being passed into Ottoman hands after its conquest by Süleyman Pasha in 1356. Occupied at the end of World War I, the town was freed from the British and French forces on 25 September 1922, toward the end of the War of Independence. In the district are the graves of 15,000 soldiers who lost their lives during the War of Independence.

The city was the port Yirmisekiz Mehmed Çelebi took off from in his embassy mission to France.

== Economy ==
The primary livelihood of the people in the area is agriculture, with fishing and tourism also being important. The most common fruits of the district include cherries and peaches. First held in 1983, the annual Cherry Festival takes place 2–12 June. A fair is also held in Lapseki on 1–4 September but shaded by the fair in nearby town Çardak in 22–26 August which closes with a wrestling competition each year - the second oldest competition in Turkey After Kirkpinar in Edirne. People come to watch the wrestlers from near provinces such as Bursa. Apart from these, the beaches and summer houses in seaside villages attract tourists as well. Numan Kurtulmuş, the deputy prime minister of Turkey, has a summer house in Suluca village of Lapseki. There are direct ferries to Gelibolu at every o'clock from Lapseki. It is an intercontinental trip from Asia to Europe.

=== Çanakkale 1915 Bridge ===
The Çanakkale 1915 Bridge is a major project planned to be completed in March 2022. It will be constructed over the Dardanelles strait from Lapseki to Sütlüce in Gallipoli Peninsula. The completion of the project is a part of the government's goals for their 2023 vision program to improve the country's infrastructure. It will provide a link from Europe to western Turkey, which is projected to boost both regional tourism and the local economy. The bridge will hold six lanes of automobile traffic. A railroad is also planned to cross on the bridge that is intended to connect the region to Istanbul or Edirne and Europe. The groundbreaking for the bridge took place on March 18, 2017. The bridge was officially opened by President Tayyip Erdogan on 18 March 2022.[6] It is the fourth bridge over the Turkish Straits.[7]With a main span of 2,023 m (6,637 ft), the bridge surpassed the Akashi Kaikyo Bridge in Japan by 32 m (105 ft) to become the longest suspension bridge in the world.[4]

== See also ==
- Lampsacus
- Abramios the Recluse
- Çanakkale 1915 Bridge
