= 380th =

380th may refer to:

- 380th (King's Own) Anti-Tank Regiment, Royal Artillery, Territorial Army unit of the British Army's Royal Artillery
- 380th Aero Squadron, training unit assigned to Selfridge Air National Guard Base in Harrison Township, Michigan, near Mount Clemens
- 380th Air Expeditionary Wing, provisional unit of the United States Air Force Air Combat Command (ACC), stationed at Al Dhafra Air Base, United Arab Emirates
- 380th Air Refueling Squadron, inactive United States Air Force unit
- 380th Expeditionary Operations Group, the operational flying component of the United States Air Force 380th Air Expeditionary Wing
- 380th Fighter Squadron, unit of Air Combat Command of the United States Air Force; flies the E-8C Joint STARS
- 380th Space Control Squadron (380 SPCS) is a space control unit located at Peterson AFB, Colorado

== See also ==
- 380 (number)
- 380 (disambiguation)
- 380, the year 380 (CCCLXXX) of the Julian calendar
- 380 BC
