= 290 =

290 in various calendars
Gregorian calendar	290; CCXC
Ab urbe condita	1043
Assyrian calendar	5040
Balinese saka calendar	211–212
Bengali calendar	−304 – −303
Berber calendar	1240
Buddhist calendar	834
Burmese calendar	−348
Byzantine calendar	5798–5799
Chinese calendar	己酉年 (Earth Rooster); 2987 or 2780 — to — 庚戌年 (Metal Dog); 2988 or 2781
Coptic calendar	6–7
Discordian calendar	1456
Ethiopian calendar	282–283
Hebrew calendar	4050–4051
- Hindu calendars
Vikram Samvat	346–347
Shaka Samvat	211–212
Kali Yuga	3390–3391
Holocene calendar	10290
Iranian calendar	332 BP – 331 BP
Islamic calendar	342 BH – 341 BH
Javanese calendar	170–171
Julian calendar	290; CCXC
Korean calendar	2623
Minguo calendar	1622 before ROC 民前1622年
Nanakshahi calendar	−1178
Seleucid era	601/602 AG
Thai solar calendar	832–833
Tibetan calendar	ས་མོ་བྱ་ལོ་ (female Earth-Bird); 416 or 35 or −737 — to — ལྕགས་ཕོ་ཁྱི་ལོ་ (male Iron-Dog); 417 or 36 or −736

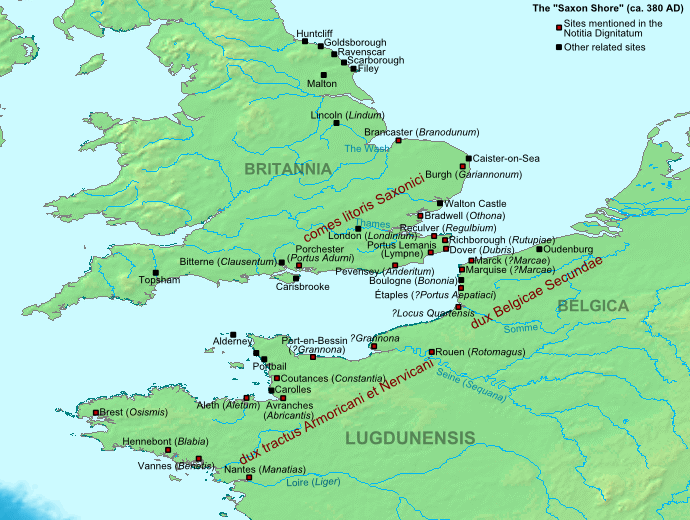
Litus Saxonicum (England)

Year 290 (CCXC) was a common year starting on Wednesday of the Julian calendar. In the Roman Empire, it was known as the Year of the Consulship of Valerius and Valerius (or, less frequently, year 1043 Ab urbe condita). The denomination 290 for this year has been used since the early medieval period, when the Anno Domini calendar era became the prevalent method in Europe for naming years.

== Events ==
=== By place ===
==== Roman Empire ====
- Emperor Diocletian campaigns with success against Arabic enemies.
- Following his victory over Emperor Maximian's fleet, the usurper Carausius invades the European mainland and re-establishes his military and administrative presence in northern Gaul.

==== Asia ====
- May 16 – Emperor Wu of Jin, founder of the Western Jin Dynasty, dies after a 25-year reign. He reunified north and south, but gave away many dukedoms to his kinsmen. Crown Prince Sima Zhong succeeds his father, and has to deal with conflicts among the aristocratic families in China.

== Births ==
- Abramios the Recluse, Christian hermit and ascetic (d. 360)
- Pappus of Alexandria, Greek mathematician (d. 350)
- Vitus (or Guido), Roman hagiographer and martyr

== Deaths ==
- May 16 – Wu of Jin, Chinese emperor of the Jin Dynasty (b. 236)
- Tao Huang (or Shiying), Chinese general and politician
