= Anaxagoreia =

Ancient Greek holiday in Lampsacus

The Anaxagoreia (Ancient Greek: Αναξαγόρεια) was a day of rest in ancient Lampsacus, during which children were forbidden to play outside the house. This "holiday" was dedicated to the philosopher Anaxagoras, who had been persecuted in Athens and sought refuge in Lampsacus. The celebration was held annually and continued until the time of Diogenes Laertius.

According to him, shortly before Anaxagoras died, the senate of Lampsacus sent messengers to ask what would be the best way to honor him. He replied, "Let all the boys have a day off to play on the anniversary of my death!"

== Bibliography ==
- Smith, William (1890). "Anaxagoreia". In Wayte, William; Marindin, G. E. (eds.). A Dictionary of Greek and Roman Antiquities.
- Peck, Harry Thurston (1898). "Anaxagoreia". Harpers Dictionary of Classical Antiquities.
- Diogenes Laertius. "Anaxagoras". In Hicks, R.D. (ed.). Lives of Eminent Philosophers. Book 2, Chapter 3.
