= Anaximenes of Lampsacus =

4th-century BC Greek rhetorician and historian

Anaximenes of Lampsacus (/ˌænækˈsɪməˌniːz/; Ancient Greek: Ἀναξιμένης ὁ Λαμψακηνός; c. 380 – 320 BC) was a Greek rhetorician and historian. He was one of the teachers of Alexander the Great and accompanied him on his campaigns.

== Family ==
His father was named Aristocles (Ancient Greek: Ἀριστοκλῆς). His nephew (son of his sister), was also named Anaximenes and was a historian.

== Rhetorical works ==
Anaximenes was a pupil of Diogenes the Cynic and Zoilus and, like his teacher, wrote a work on Homer. As a rhetorician, he was a determined opponent of Isocrates and his school. He is generally regarded as the author of the Rhetoric to Alexander, an Art of Rhetoric included in the traditional corpus of Aristotle's works. Quintilian seems to refer to this work under Anaximenes' name in Institutio Oratoria 3.4.9, as the Italian Renaissance philologist Piero Vettori first recognized. This attribution has, however, been disputed by some scholars.

The hypothesis to Isocrates' Helen mentions that Anaximenes, too, had written a Helen, "though it is more a defense speech (apologia) than an encomium," and concludes that he was "the man who has written about Helen" to whom Isocrates refers (Isoc. Helen 14). Jebb entertained the possibility that this work survives in the form of the Encomium of Helen ascribed to Gorgias: "It appears not improbable that Anaximenes may have been the real author of the work ascribed to Gorgias."

According to Pausanias (6.18.6), Anaximenes was "the first who practised the art of speaking extemporaneously." He also worked as a logographer, having written the speech prosecuting Phryne according to Diodorus Periegetes (quoted by Athenaeus XIII.591e). The "ethical" fragments preserved in Stobaeus' Florilegium may represent "some philosophical book."

According to Suda, no rhetor before Anaximenes had invented improvised speeches.

== Historical works ==
Anaximenes wrote a history of Greece in twelve books, stretching from the gods' origins to the death of Epaminondas at the Battle of Mantinea (Hellenica, Ancient Greek: Πρῶται ἱστορίαι), and a history of Philip of Macedon (Philippica). He was a favorite of Alexander the Great, whom he accompanied in his Persian campaigns, and wrote a third historical work on Alexander (however, Pausanias 6.18.6 expresses doubt about his authorship of an epic poem on Alexander). He was one of the eight exemplary historiographers included in the Alexandrian canon.

Didymus reports that the work transmitted as speech 11 of Demosthenes (Against the Letter of Philip) could be found in almost identical form in Book 7 of Anaximenes' Philippica, and many scholars regard the work as a historiographic composition by Anaximenes. The Letter of Philip (speech 12) to which speech 11 seems to respond may also be by Anaximenes, or it may be an authentic letter by Philip, perhaps written with the aid of his advisers. The more ambitious theory of Wilhelm Nitsche, which assigned to Anaximenes a larger part of the Demosthenic corpus (speeches 10-13 and 25, letters 1–4, proems), can be rejected.

Anaximenes was hostile to Theopompus, whom he sought to discredit with a libelous parody, Trikaranos, published in Theopompus' style and under his name, attacking Athens, Sparta, and Thebes. Pausanias wrote: "He imitated the style of Theopompus with perfect accuracy, inscribed his name upon the book and sent it round to the cities. Though Anaximenes was the author of the treatise, hatred of Theopompus grew throughout the length of Greece."

Plutarch criticizes Anaximenes, together with Theopompus and Ephorus, for the "rhetorical effects and grand periods" these historians implausibly gave to men in the midst of urgent battlefield circumstances (Praecepta gerendae reipublicae 803b).

== Saving Lampsacus ==
The people of Lampsacus were pro-Persian, or were suspected of doing so and Alexander was furiously angry, and threatened to do them massive harm. They sent Anaximenes to intercede for them. Alexander knew why he had come, and swore by the gods that he would do the opposite of what he would ask, so Anaximenes said, 'Please do this for me, your majesty: enslave the women and children of Lampsacus, burn their temples, and raze the city to the ground.' Alexander had no way round this clever trick, and since he was bound by his oath he reluctantly pardoned the people of Lampsacus.

== Statue at Olympia ==
The people of Lampsacus dedicated a statue of him at Olympia, Greece.

== Editions and translations ==
- Art of Rhetoric
  - edited by Immanuel Bekker, Oxford 1837 (online)
  - Anaximenis ars rhetorica, L. Spengel (ed.), Leipzig, Vergsbureau, 1847.
  - Rhetores Graeci, L. Spengel (ed.), Lipsiae, sumptibus et typis B. G. Teubneri, 1853, vol. 1 pp. 169-242.
  - edited by Manfred Fuhrmann, Bibliotheca Teubneriana, Leipzig, 1966, 2nd ed. 2000, ISBN 3-598-71983-3
  - edited by Pierre Chiron, Collection Budé, with French translation, Paris, 2002, ISBN 2-251-00498-X
  - anonymous translation, London, 1686 (online)
  - translated by E.S. Forster, Oxford, 1924 (online, beginning on p. 231)
- Fragments
  - Karl Müller, appendix to 1846 Didot edition of Arrian, Anabasis et Indica (online)
  - Felix Jacoby, Die Fragmente der griechischen Historiker, no. 72, with commentary in German
  - Ludwig Radermacher, Artium Scriptores, Vienna, 1951, pp. 200–202 (rhetorical fragments only, adding Philodemus' Rhetorica, which accounts for three of the nine fragments printed)
