= Anaxagoras =

5th-century BC Greek philosopher

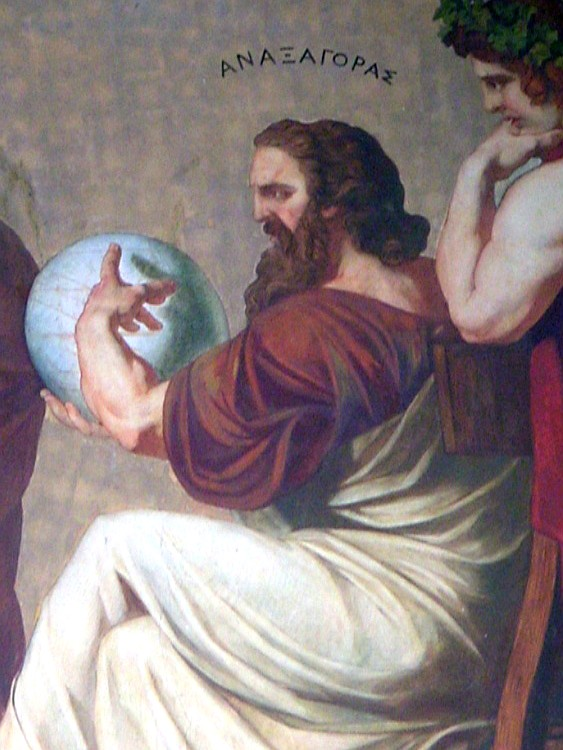
- Anaxagoras; part of a fresco in the portico of the National University of Athens.
- Born: c. 500 BC; Clazomenae, Ionia, Persian Empire
- Died: c. 428 BC; Lampsacus

Philosophical work
- Era: Ancient philosophy
- Region: Western philosophy
- School: Ionian school
- Main interests: Natural philosophy
- Notable ideas: Nous, or Mind ordering all things

Anaxagoras (/ˌænækˈsæɡərəs/; Ancient Greek: Ἀναξαγόρας, Anaxagóras; c. 500 BC – c. 428 BC) was a pre-Socratic Greek philosopher. Born in Clazomenae at a time when Asia Minor was under the control of the Persian Empire, Anaxagoras came to Athens. In later life he was charged with impiety and went into exile in Lampsacus.

Responding to the claims of Parmenides on the impossibility of change, Anaxagoras introduced the concept of Nous (Cosmic Mind) as an ordering force. He also gave several novel scientific accounts of natural phenomena, including the notion of panspermia, that life exists throughout the universe and could be distributed everywhere. He deduced a correct explanation for eclipses and described the Sun as a fiery mass larger than the Peloponnese, and also attempted to explain rainbows and meteors. He also speculated that the sun might be just another star.

== Biography ==
Anaxagoras was born in the town of Clazomenae in the early 5th century BC, where he may have been born into an aristocratic family. He arrived at Athens, either shortly after the Persian war (in which he may have fought on the Persian side), or at some point when he was a bit older, around 456 BC. While at Athens, he became close with the Athenian statesman Pericles. According to Diogenes Laërtius and Plutarch, in later life he was charged with impiety and went into exile in Lampsacus; the charges may have been political, owing to his association with Pericles, if they were not fabricated by later ancient biographers. According to Laërtius, Pericles spoke in defense of Anaxagoras at his trial (Note: Laertius 2.15), c. 450. Even so, Anaxagoras was forced to retire from Athens to Lampsacus in Troad (c. 434 – 433). He died of starvation there around the year 428. Citizens of Lampsacus erected an altar to Mind and Truth in his memory and observed the anniversary of his death for many years. They placed over his grave the following inscription:

Here Anaxagoras, who in his quest of truth scaled heaven itself, is laid to rest. (Note: Ancient Greek: ἐνθάδε, πλεῖστον ἀληθείας ἐπὶ τέρμα περήσας οὐρανίου κόσμου, κεῖται Ἀναξαγόρας.) (Note: Laertius 2.15)

Additionally, in his honor, the annual celebration known as the Anaxagoreia was established. (Note: Laertius 2.3)

== Philosophy ==
Responding to the claims of Parmenides on the impossibility of change, Anaxagoras described the world as a mixture of primary imperishable ingredients, where material variation was never caused by an absolute presence of a particular ingredient, but rather by its relative preponderance over the other ingredients; in his words, "each one is... most manifestly those things of which there are the most in it". He introduced the concept of nous (cosmic mind) as an ordering force, which moved and separated the original mixture, which was homogeneous or nearly so.

Anaxagoras brought philosophy and the spirit of scientific inquiry from Ionia to Athens. According to Anaxagoras, all things have existed in some way from the beginning, but originally they existed in infinitesimally small fragments of themselves, endless in number and inextricably combined throughout the universe. All things existed in this mass but in a confused and indistinguishable form. There was an infinite number of homogeneous parts (ὁμοιομερῆ) as well as heterogeneous ones.

The work of arrangement, the segregation of like from unlike, and the summation of the whole into totals of the same name, was the work of Mind or Reason (νοῦς). Mind is no less unlimited than the chaotic mass, but it stood pure and independent, a thing of finer texture, alike in all its manifestations and everywhere the same. This subtle agent, possessed of all knowledge and power, is especially seen ruling all life forms. (Note: B12) Its first appearance, and the only manifestation of it which Anaxagoras describes, is Motion. It gave distinctness and reality to the aggregates of like parts.

Decrease and growth represent a new aggregation (σὐγκρισις) and disruption (διάκρισις). However, the original intermixture of things is never wholly overcome. Each thing contains parts of other things or heterogeneous elements, and is what it is only on account of the preponderance of certain homogeneous parts which constitute its character. Out of this process arise the things we see in this world.

=== Astronomy ===
Plutarch (Note: Life of Lysander 12.1) says "Anaxagoras is said to have predicted that if the heavenly bodies should be loosened by some slip or shake, one of them might be torn away, and might plunge and fall to earth."

His observations of the celestial bodies and the fall of meteorites led him to form new theories of the universal order, and to the prediction of the impact of meteorites. According to Pliny (Note: Natural History 2.149), he was credited with predicting the fall of the meteorite in 467 BC. He was the first to give a correct explanation of eclipses, and was both famous and notorious for his scientific theories, including the claims that the Sun is a mass of red-hot metal, that the Moon is earthy, and that the stars are fiery stones. (Note: Curd) He thought that the Earth was flat and floated supported by 'strong' air under it, and that disturbances in this air sometimes caused earthquakes. (Note: Burnet) He introduced the notion of panspermia, that life exists throughout the universe and could be distributed everywhere.

He attempted to give a scientific account of eclipses, meteors, rainbows, and the Sun, which he described as a mass of blazing metal, larger than the Peloponnese; he also said that the Moon had mountains, and he believed that it was inhabited. The heavenly bodies, he asserted, were masses of stone torn from the Earth and ignited by rapid rotation. His theories about eclipses, the Sun, and Moon may well have been based on observations of the eclipse of 463 BC, which was visible in Greece.

Anaxagoras was one of the first to assert that the Moon reflected sunlight and did not produce light by itself; a statement translated as “the sun induces the moon with brightness” was found in his writings.

Anaxagoras is the first known to have believed the stars had the same nature as the Sun, hypothesising both to be hot balls of metal, with the stars too far away to cause any perceptible heat.

=== Mathematics ===
According to Plutarch in his work On exile, Anaxagoras is the first Greek to attempt the problem of squaring the circle, a problem he worked on while in prison. (Note: Plutarch, On exile)

== Legacy ==
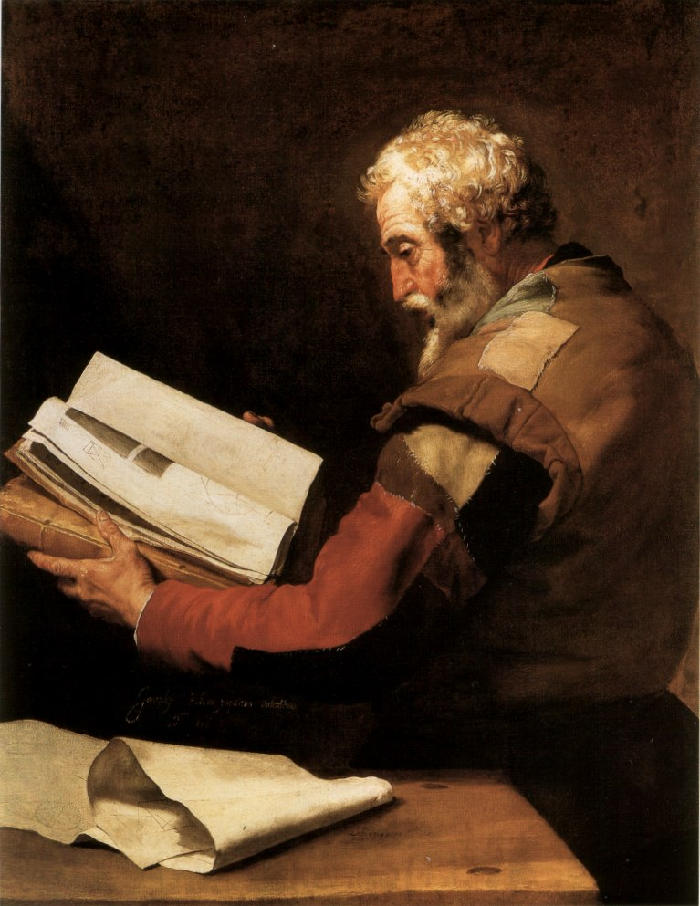
Anaxagoras (1636) by Jusepe de Ribera

Anaxagoras wrote a book of philosophy, but only fragments of the first part of this have survived, through preservation in the work of Simplicius of Cilicia in the 6th century AD. (Note: Simplicius)

Anaxagoras’ book was reportedly available for a drachma in the Athenian marketplace. It was certainly known to Sophocles, Euripides, and Aristophanes, based on the contents of their surviving plays, and possibly to Aeschylus as well, based on the testimony of Seneca. However, although Anaxagoras almost certainly lived in Athens during the lifetime of Socrates (born 470 BC), there is no evidence that they ever met. In the Phaedo, Plato portrays Socrates saying of Anaxagoras as a young man: “I eagerly acquired his books and read them as quickly as I could.” However, Socrates goes on to describe his later disillusionment with his philosophy. (Note: Plato, Phaedo, 85b) Anaxagoras is also mentioned by Socrates during his trial in Plato's Apology.

He is also mentioned in Seneca's Natural Questions (Book 4B, originally Book 3: On Clouds, Hail, Snow). It reads: “Why should I too allow myself the same liberty as Anaxagoras allowed himself?”

The Roman author Valerius Maximus preserves a different tradition; Anaxagoras, coming home from a long voyage, found his property in ruin, and said: “If this had not perished, I would have” — a sentence described by Valerius as being “possessed of sought-after wisdom.” (Note: Val. Max., VIII, 7, ext., 5: Qui, cum e diutina peregrinatione patriam repetisset possessionesque desertas vidisset, non essem – inquit ego salvus, nisi istae perissent. Vocem petitae sapientiae compotem!)

Dante Alighieri places Anaxagoras in the First Circle of Hell (Limbo) in his Divine Comedy (Inferno, Canto IV, line 137).

Chapter 5 in Book II of De Docta Ignorantia (1440) by Nicholas of Cusa is dedicated to the truth of the sentence “Each thing is in each thing” which he attributes to Anaxagoras.

The French revolutionary Pierre Gaspard Chaumette changed his name to Anaxagoras in December 1792, explaining: "I was formerly called Pierre-Gaspard Chaumette because my god-father believed in the saints. Since the revolution I have taken the name of a saint who was hanged for his republican principles."

Anaxagoras appears as a character in the second Act of Faust, Part II by Johann Wolfgang von Goethe.

Friedrich Nietzsche also frequently mentions Anaxagoras in the later chapters of his book entitled Philosophy in the Tragic Age of the Greeks. He speaks fondly of Anaxagoras' nous, and defends the idea by claiming philosophers had “failed to recognize the meaning of Anaxagoras’ [nous]…” and believed that it was “perfectly sufficient for his insight to have found a motion which is capable of creating visible order in a thoroughly mixed chaos, by means of a simple continuous action.” Nietzsche believes it is essential to understand Anaxagoras' nous as a sort of act of free will, not determined by any previous action before.

The quote “I came into this world to see the Sun” is attributed to Anaxagoras in the epigraph to Russian Silver Age poet Konstantin Balmont's sixth book of poetry, Let Us Be Like the Sun (1903).

Anaxagoras appears as a character met during the trial of his exile in the game Assassin’s Creed Odyssey. His protégé, Socrates, issues a quest in which the player must decide whether to aid his escape from judgement.

In 1935, the lunar crater Anaxagoras was named after him.
