= Polyaenus of Lampsacus =

Ancient Greek mathematician (c. 340–285 BC)

Polyaenus of Lampsacus (/ˌpɒliːˈiːnəs/ POL-ee-EE-nəs; Ancient Greek: Πoλύαινoς Λαμψακηνός, Polyainos Lampsakēnos; c. 340 – c. 285 BCE), also spelled Polyenus, was an ancient Greek mathematician and a friend of Epicurus.

== Life ==
He was the son of Athenodorus. His friendship with Epicurus started after the latter's escape from Mytilene in 307 or 306 BC when he opened a philosophical school at Lampsacus associating himself with other citizens of the town, like Pythocles, Colotes, and Idomeneus. With these fellow citizens he moved to Athens, where they founded a school of philosophy with Epicurus as head, or hegemon, while Polyaenus, Hermarchus and Metrodorus were kathegemones.

A man of mild and friendly manners, as Philodemus refers, he adopted fully the philosophical system of his friend, and, although he had previously acquired great reputation as a mathematician, he now maintained with Epicurus the worthlessness of geometry. But the statement may be at least doubted, since it is certain Polyaenus wrote a mathematical work called Puzzles (Greek: Aπoριαι) in which the validity of geometry is maintained. It was against this treatise that another Epicurean, Demetrius Lacon, wrote Unsolved questions of Polyaenus (Greek: Πρὸς τὰς Πoλυαίνoυ ἀπoρίας) in the 2nd century BCE. Like Epicurus, a considerable number of spurious works seem to have been assigned to him; one of these was Against the Orators, whose authenticity was attacked both by Zeno of Sidon and his pupil Philodemus.

== Writings ==
The works attributed to Polyaenus include:

- On Definitions
- On Philosophy
- Against Aristo
- Puzzles (Aporiai)
- On the Moon
- Against the Orators
- His collected Letters.
