= 236 =

236 in various calendars
- Gregorian calendar: 236; CCXXXVI
- Ab urbe condita: 989
- Assyrian calendar: 4986
- Balinese saka calendar: 157–158
- Bengali calendar: −358 – −357
- Berber calendar: 1186
- Buddhist calendar: 780
- Burmese calendar: −402
- Byzantine calendar: 5744–5745
- Chinese calendar: 乙卯年 (Wood Rabbit); 2933 or 2726 — to — 丙辰年 (Fire Dragon); 2934 or 2727
- Coptic calendar: −48 – −47
- Discordian calendar: 1402
- Ethiopian calendar: 228–229
- Hebrew calendar: 3996–3997
- Hindu calendars
- Vikram Samvat: 292–293
- Shaka Samvat: 157–158
- Kali Yuga: 3336–3337
- Holocene calendar: 10236
- Iranian calendar: 386 BP – 385 BP
- Islamic calendar: 398 BH – 397 BH
- Javanese calendar: 114–115
- Julian calendar: 236; CCXXXVI
- Korean calendar: 2569
- Minguo calendar: 1676 before ROC 民前1676年
- Nanakshahi calendar: −1232
- Seleucid era: 547/548 AG
- Thai solar calendar: 778–779
- Tibetan calendar: ཤིང་མོ་ཡོས་ལོ་ (female Wood-Hare); 362 or −19 or −791 — to — མེ་ཕོ་འབྲུག་ལོ་ (male Fire-Dragon); 363 or −18 or −790

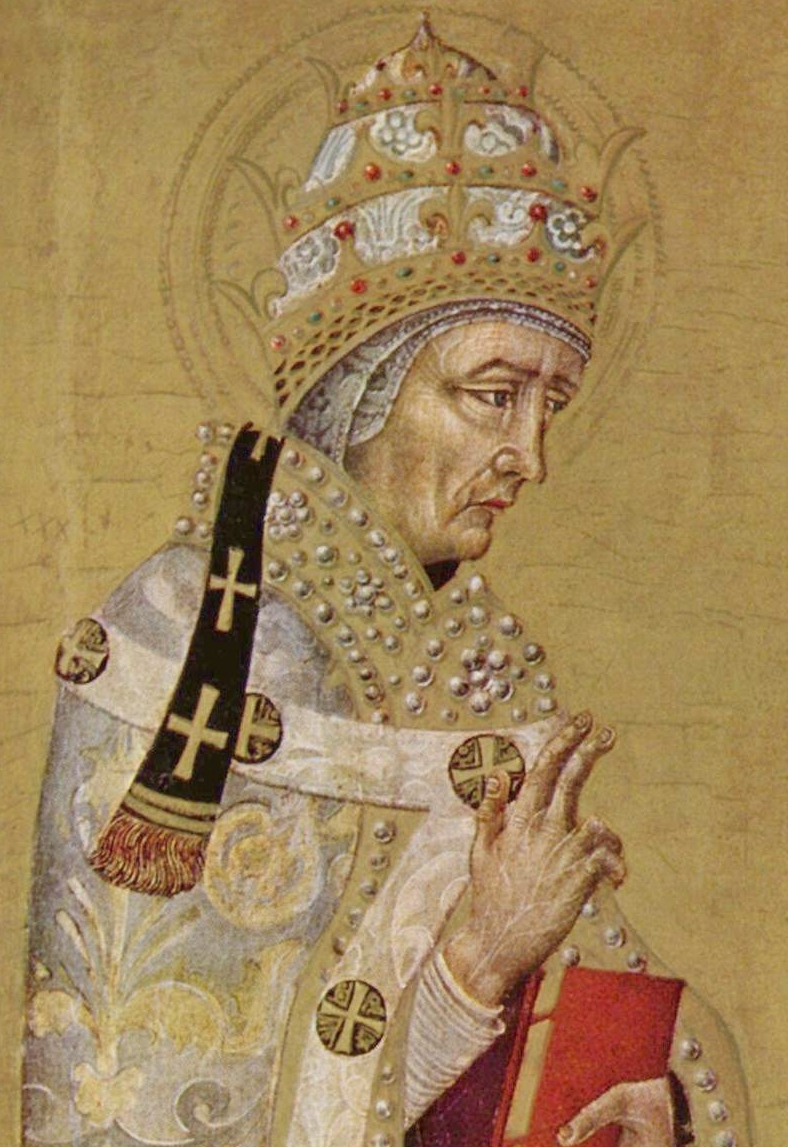
Pope Fabian (236–250)

Year 236 (CCXXXVI) was a leap year starting on Friday of the Julian calendar. At the time, it was known as the Year of the Consulship of Verus and Africanus (or, less frequently, year 989 Ab urbe condita). The denomination 236 for this year has been used since the early medieval period, when the Anno Domini calendar era became the prevalent method in Europe for naming years.

== Events ==
=== By place ===
==== Roman Empire ====
- Emperor Maximinus Thrax and Marcus Pupienus Africanus Maximus become Roman consuls.
- Maximinus campaigns against Dacians and Sarmatians from his supply depot at Sirmium.

=== By topic ===
==== Religion ====
- January 10 – Pope Fabian succeeds Pope Anterus as the twentieth pope.
- Fabian separates Rome into seven deaconships.
- Fabian sends seven missionaries to Gaul to evangelize in the large cities.

== Births ==
- Wu of Jin (Sima Yan), Chinese emperor (d. 290)
- Zhang Ti, Chinese official and chancellor (d. 280)
- Zhou Chu, Chinese general and politician (d. 297)

== Deaths ==
- January 3 – Anterus, bishop of Rome
- July 4 – Dong Zhao, Chinese official and politician (b. 156)
- Zhang Zhao, Chinese general and politician (b. 156)
