= 380 =

380 in various calendars
Gregorian calendar	380; CCCLXXX
Ab urbe condita	1133
Assyrian calendar	5130
Balinese saka calendar	301–302
Bengali calendar	−214 – −213
Berber calendar	1330
Buddhist calendar	924
Burmese calendar	−258
Byzantine calendar	5888–5889
Chinese calendar	己卯年 (Earth Rabbit); 3077 or 2870 — to — 庚辰年 (Metal Dragon); 3078 or 2871
Coptic calendar	96–97
Discordian calendar	1546
Ethiopian calendar	372–373
Hebrew calendar	4140–4141
- Hindu calendars
Vikram Samvat	436–437
Shaka Samvat	301–302
Kali Yuga	3480–3481
Holocene calendar	10380
Iranian calendar	242 BP – 241 BP
Islamic calendar	249 BH – 248 BH
Javanese calendar	262–263
Julian calendar	380; CCCLXXX
Korean calendar	2713
Minguo calendar	1532 before ROC 民前1532年
Nanakshahi calendar	−1088
Seleucid era	691/692 AG
Thai solar calendar	922–923
Tibetan calendar	阴土兔年 (female Earth-Rabbit); 506 or 125 or −647 — to — 阳金龙年 (male Iron-Dragon); 507 or 126 or −646

Year 380 (CCCLXXX) was a leap year starting on Wednesday of the Julian calendar. At the time, it was known as the Year of the Consulship of Augustus and Augustus (or, less frequently, year 1133 Ab urbe condita). The denomination 380 for this year has been used since the early medieval period, when the Anno Domini calendar era became the prevalent method in Europe for naming years.

== Events ==
=== By place ===
==== Roman Empire ====
- February 27 – Edict of Thessalonica: Theodosius I, with co-emperors Gratian and Valentinian II, declare their wish that all Roman citizens convert to trinitarian Christianity, in accordance with the patriarchs of Rome and Alexandria, implicitly rejecting the Arianism of the patriarch of Constantinople as heretical.
- Battle of Thessalonica: The Goths under Fritigern defeat a Roman army in Macedonia. Theodosius I retreats to Thessalonica and leaves Gratian in control of the Western Roman Empire.
- Rome's enemies (the Germans, Sarmatians and Huns) are taken into Imperial service; as a consequence, barbarian leaders begin to play an increasingly active role in the Roman Empire.
- November 24 – Theodosius I makes his adventus, or formal entry, into Constantinople.
- Queen Mavia, with her Saracen forces, defeats the Roman army in southern Syria.
- Emperor Theodosius I is baptized.

==== Europe ====
- The Visigothic chieftain Fritigern dies after ravaging the Balkans; his rival Athanaric becomes king of the entire Gothic nation.

==== India ====
- The annexation of western provinces by Chandragupta II gives him commerce with Europe and Egypt.

==== Pacific ====
- Easter Island, in the south Pacific Ocean, has been occupied by Neolithic seafarers under Hotu Matu'a ("supreme chief"), who about this time begin to fortify the island.

=== By topic ===
==== Arts and sciences ====
- Important works on mathematics and astronomy are written in Sanskrit.

==== Religion ====
- Ticonius writes a commentary on the Bible's Book of Revelation.
- A cathedral is built in Augusta Treverorum.
- The Council of Saragossa is held; Spanish and Aquitanian bishops condemn the teachings of Priscillianism.

== Births ==
- Aelia Eudoxia, empress and wife of Arcadius (approximate date)
- Alexius, Eastern saint (approximate date)
- Eucherius, bishop of Lyon (approximate date)
- Eutyches, presbyter and archimandrite (approximate date)
- Hephaestion of Thebes, Egyptian astrologer (approximate date)
- Kālidāsa, Classical Sanskrit writer (approximate date)
- Olympiodorus of Thebes, historical writer (approximate date)
- Peter Chrysologus, bishop of Ravenna (approximate date)
- Philip of Side, Christian church historian (approximate date)
- Socrates of Constantinople, church historian (approximate date)

== Deaths ==
- April 10 – James, Azadanus and Abdicius, Roman Catholic priests, martyrs and saints

=== Date unknown ===
- Fritigern, king of the Visigoths
- Samudragupta, ruler of the Gupta Empire
- Wang Fahui, empress of the Jin dynasty (b. 360)
