= Euaeon of Lampsacus =

Ancient Greek philosopher

Euaeon of Lampsacus (Greek: Εὐαίων Λαμψακηνός) was one of Plato's students.
