= James, Azadanus and Abdicius =

Martyrs of the Christian Church

James, Azadanus and Abdicius (died April 10, 380) are martyrs of the Christian Church. James was a priest and Azadanus and Abdicius deacons. They were beheaded by Shapur II in Persia in 380. They are collectively commemorated with a feast day on April 10.
