= Reinhold F. Glei =

German philologist and translator (born 1959)

Reinhold Fürchtegott Glei (German: [glaɪ]; born 11 June 1959 in Remscheid) is a German philologist and translator.
