= Hermarchus =

Ancient Greek philosopher (c. 325-c. 250 BC)

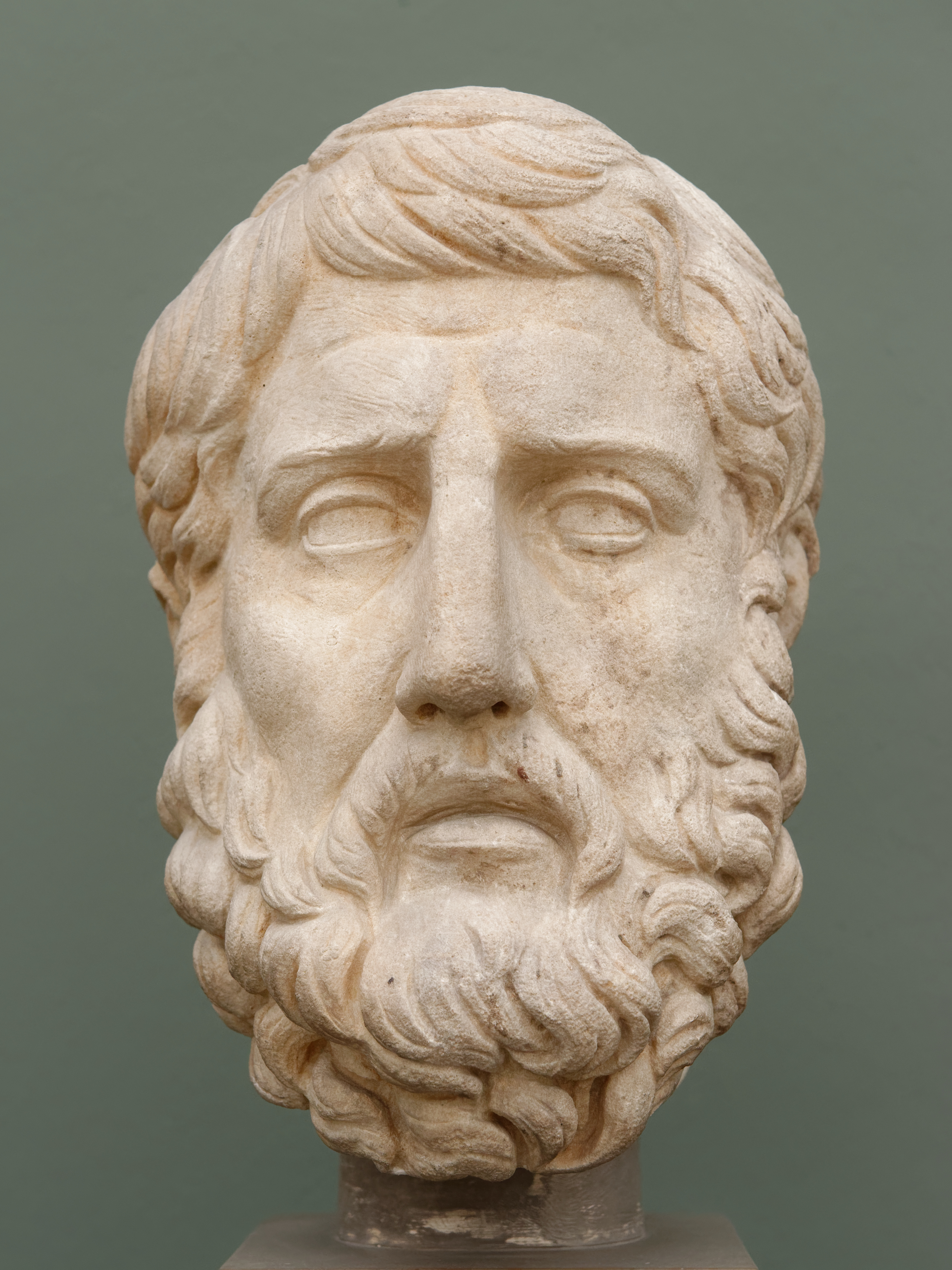
- Roman marble bust of Hermarchus
- Born: c. 325 BC; Mytilene
- Died: c. 250 BC (aged approx. 75)

Philosophical work
- Era: Hellenistic philosophy
- Region: Western philosophy
- School: Epicureanism
- Main interests: Ethics; theology

Hermarchus or Hermarch (Ancient Greek: Ἕρμαρχoς, Hermarkhos; c. 325 – c. 250 BC), sometimes incorrectly written Hermachus (Ἕρμαχoς, Hermakhos), was an Epicurean philosopher. He was the disciple and successor of Epicurus as head of the school. None of his writings survives. He wrote works directed against Plato, Aristotle, and Empedocles. A fragment from his Against Empedocles, preserved by Porphyry, discusses the need for law in society. His views on the nature of the gods are quoted by Philodemus.

== Life ==
Hermarchus was a son of Agemarchus, a poor man of Mytilene (in insular Greece), and was at first brought up as a rhetorician, but afterwards became a faithful disciple of Epicurus, who left to him his garden, and appointed him his successor as the head of his school, about 270 BC. He died in the house of Lysias at an advanced age, and left behind him the reputation of a great philosopher. Cicero has preserved a letter of Epicurus addressed to him.

Diogenes Laërtius mentioned from a letter written by Epicurus, "All my books to be given to Hermarchus. And if anything should happen to Hermarchus before the children of Metrodorus grow up, Amynomachus and Timocrates shall give from the funds bequeathed by me, so far as possible, enough for their several needs, as long as they are well ordered. And let them provide for the rest according to my arrangements; that everything may be carried out, so far as it lies in their power."

== Writings ==
Hermarchus was the author of several works, which are characterised by Diogenes Laërtius as "excellent" (Greek: κάλλιστα):

- Πρὸς Ἐμπεδoκλέα – Against Empedocles (in 22 books)
- Περὶ τῶν μαθημάτων – On the mathematicians
- Πρὸς Πλάτωνα – Against Plato
- Πρὸς Ἀριστoτέλην – Against Aristotle

All of these works are lost, and save for the fragmentary Against Empedocles we know nothing about them but their titles. But from an expression of Cicero, we may infer that his works were of a polemical nature, and directed against the philosophy of Plato and Aristotle, and on Empedocles.

A long fragment (quotation or paraphrase) from an unspecified work of Hermarchus' has been preserved by Porphyry. This fragment is probably from his Against Empedocles. In this fragment, Hermarchus discusses the reasons for punishment for murder. He argues that early law-makers were guided by the principle that murder was not good for society, and were able to educate other people that this was a rational principle. They then created punishments for those people who could not be educated. For everyone who understood that murder was not useful, laws would not be needed; punishments are only needed for those who fail to understand this. For Hermarchus, this was an example of social progress and an increase in rationality.

Philodemus in his On the Way of Life of the Gods, quotes the view of Hermarchus that the gods breathe, because the gods are living beings and all living things breathe. Philodemus goes on to say that, according to Hermarchus, the gods must talk to one another, because conversation is conducive to happiness:

And one must say that they use speech and converse with one another; for, he [Hermarchus] says, we would not consider them more fortunate and indestructible if they did not, but rather similar to mute human beings. For since in fact all of us who are not maimed make use of language, to say that the gods either are maimed or do not resemble us in this respect (there being no other way either they or we could give shape to utterances) is extremely foolish, especially since conversation with those like themselves is a source of indescribable pleasure to the good.
