= Abramios the Recluse =

Christian hermit and ascetic (290-360)

Saint Abramios the Recluse
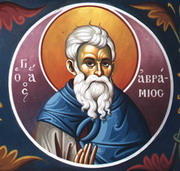
- Saint Abramios the Recluse

Venerable father
- Born: 290; Edessa (modern-day Şanlıurfa, Turkey)
- Died: 360 (aged 69–70); Lampsacus (modern-day Lapseki, Çanakkale, Turkey)
- Venerated in: Eastern Orthodox Church
- Feast: 11 November

Saint Abramios the Recluse (290–360) was an early Christian hermit and ascetic from Edessa.

He is the same as Abraham of Kidunaja.

== Biography ==
Abramios was born in 290 AD in Edessa (modern-day Şanlıurfa, Turkey). On the day of his wedding, he left his fiancée and went to the coast of the Sea of Marmara, near Lampsacus (modern-day Lapseki). There, he lived in a cave and left it only two times: first, when he was ordered to baptise a pagan village; and second, to free his niece Maria from sin. He achieved perfection in hermetic life and was devoted to the God and praying. When his parents died and left him large fortune, he distributed his possessions among the poor.

He died in 360 AD. His feast day is on October 29 (November 11 in Gregorian calendar).

== See also ==
- Hermit
- Lampsakos
