= Colotes =

Ancient Greek philosopher

Colotes of Lampsacus (Greek: Κολώτης Λαμψακηνός, Kolōtēs Lampsakēnos; c. 320 – after 268 BC) was a pupil of Epicurus. He wrote a work to prove "That it is impossible even to live according to the doctrines of the other philosophers" (ὅτι κατὰ τὰ τῶν ἄλλων φιλοσόφων δόγματα οὐδὲ ζῆν ἐστιν) and dedicated it to Ptolemy II Philadelphus, in all likelihood meant for the Library of Alexandria. Although this work is lost, its arguments are preserved in two works written by Plutarch in refutation of it: "That it is impossible even to live pleasantly according to Epicurus", and Against Colotes. According to Plutarch, Colotes attacked Socrates and other great philosophers in this work. Some fragments of two other works of Colotes have been discovered at the Villa of the Papyri at Herculaneum: Against Plato's Lysis, and Against Plato's Euthydemus. According to Plutarch, Colotes, upon hearing Epicurus discourse on the nature of things, fell on his knees before him, and besought Epicurus to give him instruction. Plutarch claims that Colotes was a great favorite with Epicurus, who used, by way of endearment, to call him Koλωτάρας and Koλωτάριoς. Cicero also recounts that Colotes held that it is unworthy of the truthfulness of a philosopher to use fables in his teaching, a notion which Cicero opposes.
